= SpatiaLite =

Spatial extension to SQLite

- Developer: Alessandro Furieri
- Release: March 21, 2008
- Stable release: 5.1.0 / August 4, 2023
- Written in: spatialite-gui: (C++, wxWidgets)
- Operating system: Linux, MS-Windows, macOS, POSIX compliant systems
- Type: Geographic information system
- License: MPL GPL LGPL tri-license
- Website: https://www.gaia-gis.it/fossil/libspatialite/
- Repository: www.gaia-gis.it/fossil/libspatialite/index

SpatiaLite is a spatial extension to SQLite, providing vector geodatabase functionality. It is similar to PostGIS, Oracle Spatial, and SQL Server with spatial extensions, although SQLite/SpatiaLite aren't based on client-server architecture: they adopt a simpler personal architecture. i.e. the whole SQL engine is directly embedded within the application itself: a complete database simply is an ordinary file which can be freely copied and transferred from one computer/OS to a different one without any special precaution.

SpatiaLite extends SQLite's existing spatial support to cover the OGC's SFS specification. It isn't necessary to use SpatiaLite to manage spatial data in SQLite, which has its own implementation of R-tree indexes and geometry types. But SpatiaLite is needed for advanced spatial queries and to support multiple map projections. SpatiaLite is provided natively for Linux and Windows as a software library as well several utilities that incorporate the SpatiaLite library. These utilities include command line tools that extend SQLite's own with spatial macros, a graphical GUI for manipulating Spatialite databases and their data, and a simple desktop GIS tool for browsing data.

As it is a single binary file, SpatiaLite is also used as a GIS vector format to exchange geospatial data.

== Software that supports SpatiaLite ==
- Desktop:
  - ESRI ArcGIS since version 10.2 as "Database Connection".
  - QGIS supports SpatiaLite native since version 1.1
  - AutocadMap 2013
  - Global Mapper
  - OpenJUMP offers a Plug-In.
  - FME (also available as server)
  - TileMill renderer (uses Mapnik) reads SpatiaLite as data source.
  - Spatial Manager Desktop, Spatial Manager for AutoCAD, Spatial Manager for BricsCAD
- (Web)Server:
  - GeoServer via SpatiaLite extension.
  - GeoDjango via the GeoDjango module.
  - Web2py (web framework) native
  - FeatureServer, a WFS server.
  - MapServer via the GDAL library (actually OGR).
- Tools and libraries:
  - OGR Simple Feature Library reads and writes SpatiaLite since version 1.7
  - GeoTools supports SpatiaLite using JDBC module.
  - Mapnik, a renderer.
  - pyspatialite, a Python library.
  - OSGeo Live DVD includes spatialite along with a short tutorial.
- Web Apps:
  - GeoConverter - Free online data converter which reads and writes several GIS vector file formats (based on OGR), including SpatiaLite.

== Standards ==
SpatiaLite supports several open standards from the OGC and has been listed as a reference implementation for the proposed GeoPackage standard.
