= GvSIG =

Desktop application for working with geographic data

gvSIG
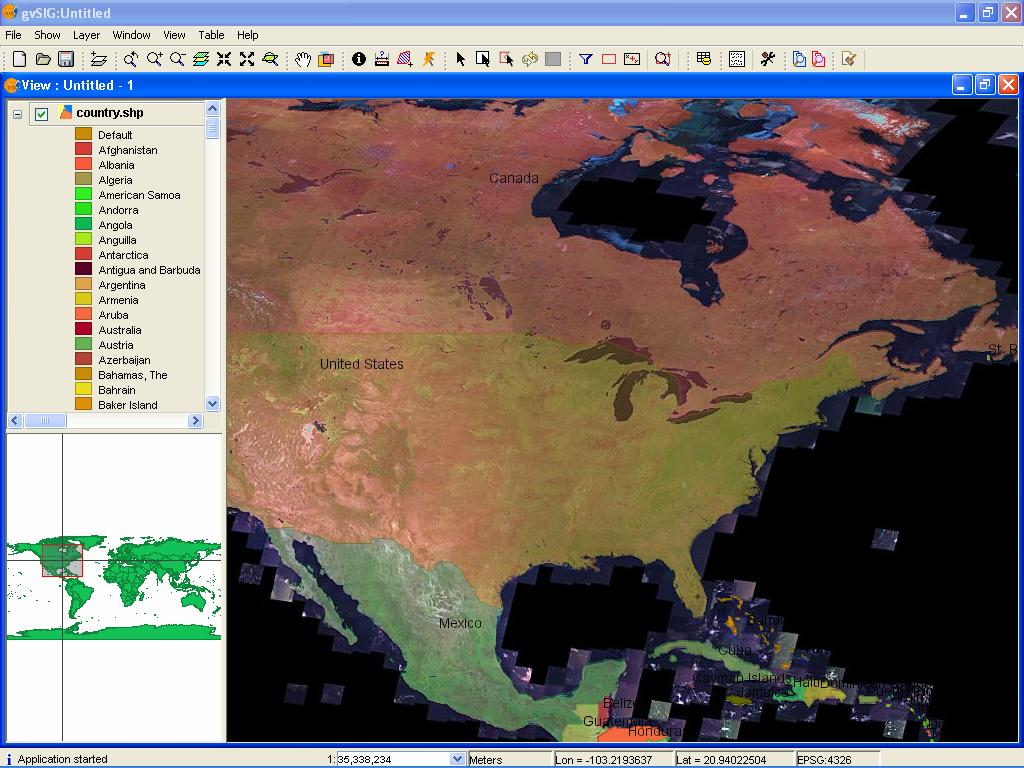
- Developer: gvSIG Association
- Release: October 2004
- Stable release: 2.6 / 6 November 2019; 3 November 2020
- Written in: Java
- Operating system: Windows, Linux, Mac OS
- Platform: Java
- Available in: CA, DE, EN, ES, EU, FR, GL, IT, PT,...
- Type: GIS
- License: GNU GPL
- Website: www.gvsig.org
- Repository: github.com/gvSIGAssociation

gvSIG, geographic information system (GIS), is a desktop application designed for capturing, storing, handling, analyzing and deploying any kind of referenced geographic information in order to solve complex management and planning problems. gvSIG is known for having a user-friendly interface, being able to access the most common formats, both vector and raster ones. It features a wide range of tools for working with geographic-like information (query tools, layout creation, geoprocessing, networks, etc.).

- Integrating in the same view both local (files, databases) and remote data through OGC standards.
- Including a plugin system which allows to easily extend the application or to develop tailor-made solutions.
- Being open source software under the GNU General Public License (GPL), which allows its free use, distribution, study and improvement.
- Being available in several languages: Spanish, English UK, English USA, German, French, Italian, Portuguese, Portuguese-Brazilian, Russian, Chinese, Serbian, Swahili, Turkish, Czech, Polish, Romanian, Greek, Basque, Valencian/Catalan, Galician.
- Being developed using Java, and being available for Linux, Windows and Mac OS X platforms

== Nomenclature ==
gvSIG was initially developed for the Generalitat Valenciana (gv), an institution of the self-governed autonomous community of Valencia. This explains the abbreviation gvSIG for which the last three letters stands for Sistema d'informació geogràfica (SIG), or GIS in English.

== Features gvSIG Desktop ==
Typical tools in a full-fledged desktop GIS client can also be found in gvSIG, among other things:

- Access to vector formats: SHP, DXF, GML, DWG, DGN, KML.
- Access to raster formats: BMP, GIF, TIFF, JPEG, JP2, PNG, VRT, DAT of ENVI, ERDAS (LAN, GIS, IMG), PCI Geomatics (PIX, AUX), ADF of ESRI, ILWIS (MPR, MPL), MAP of PC Raster, ASC, PGM, PPM, RST of IDRISI, RMF, NOS, KAP, HDR, RAW.
- Access to remote services: OGC (WMS, WFS, WCS, WFS-T, WPS), ArcIMS, Ecwp.
- Access to databases and tables: PostGIS, ArcSDE, JDBC, CSV.
- Display:zooms, panning, frames, locator.
- Query: information, area and distance measurement, hyperlink.
- Selection: by point, by rectangle, by polygon, by layer, by polyline, by circle, by buffer zone, alphanumeric search, invert selection, delete selection.
- Searching: by attribute, by coordinates.
- Geoprocessing: buffer, intersection, clip, dissolve, union, convex hull, difference, merge, spatial join, XY shift, reprojection, Sextante geoprocessing.
- Graphical editing: add event layers, snapping, grid, flatness, command stack, undo/redo, copy, move, symmetry, rotate, scale, edit vertex, internal polygon, matrix, explode, split, join, autocomplete polygon, insert point, multipoint, line, arc, polyline, polygon, rectangle, square, circle, ellipse.
- Alphanumeric editing: manage fields, edit registers, field calculator.
- Catalogue and gazetteer services
- Vector representation: unique symbol, quantities (dot density, intervals, graduated symbols, proportional symbols), categories (expressions, unique values), multiple attributes, save/load legend, symbology constructor, symbology levels, symbology libraries.
- Raster representation: brightness, contrast, enhance, transparency by pixel, opacity, colour tables, gradients.
- Labeling: Static labeling, advanced labeling, individual labeling.
- Tables: statistics, filter, ascending/descending order, link, join, move selection, export, import fields, coding, normalization.
- Layout constructor: page layout, cartographic elements (view, legend, north, scale, frames, image, text, graphic), grid, templates.
- Printing: to PDF, to Postscript, export to several image formats.
- Network analysis: network topology, stops manager, minimum path, connectivity, minimum spanning tree, origin - destination matrix, emergency / nearest facilities provider, service areas.
- Raster and remote sensing: statistics, filters, histogram, scale range, enhance, save to raster file, vectorization, Region of Interest (ROI) definition, general components, georeferencing, geolocation, supervised classification, band algebra, image profiles, decision tree, main components, tasseled cap, image fusion, scatter diagram, mosaics.
- Publishing: MapServer's WCS, WMS and WFS, Geoserver's WFS.
- 3D and animation: 3D Views, XYZ-projected as well as spherical (planetary), 3D layers, 3D symbology, 3D editing, 3D framing, 2D and 3D animation, stereo viewing (horizontal split).
- Topology: topological building, topological editing, generalization, reverse line direction, polygons from/to lines, lines from/to points, Delaunay triangulation, Thiessen polygons, build, clean, topological error fixing (in Batch mode).
- Other: Coordinates Reference Systems manager, import from/export to WMC, scripting, translations manager.

Sextante GIS has been ported to a plugin for gvSIG adding analysis functions for raster datasets in addition to gvSIG's built-in vector analysis tools. Within Sextante, GRASS GIS can be used as extension to make its algorithms available to gvSIG users.

== gvSIG Mobile ==
gvSIG Mobile aims at broadening gvSIG execution platforms to a range of mobile devices, in order to give an answer to the needs of a growing number of mobile solutions users, who wish to use a GIS on different types of devices. So far, gvSIG Mobile is a Geographic Information System, as well as a Spatial Data Infrastructures client for mobile devices. Such a client is also the first one licensed under open source. gvSIG Mobile is known for:

- integrating in the same view both local and remote data through OGC standards.
- being open source software, under the GNU GPL v2, what allows its free use, distribution, study and improvement.
- being available in several languages (Spanish, English, German, French, ...) .
- being developed using Java, and it's available for platforms supporting Java Micro Edition CDC 1.1. So far, it runs on the following platforms: Windows Mobile 5.0, Windows Mobile 6.0 and Nokia Maemo

=== Features gvSIG Mobile ===
Typical tools in a mobile GIS client can also be found in gvSIG Mobile:

- Access to vector formats: SHP, GML, KML, GPX
- Access to raster formats: ECW, JPEG, PNG, GIF.
- Access to remote services: OGC (WMS).
- Display: zooms, panning, automatic recentre tool.
- Query: information, see coordinates, distance and areas measurement.
- Selection: by point, by rectangle, by attributes, clear selection.
- Search: by attribute.
- GPS: internal/external GPS connection, reprojection to UTM, simulated NMEA frames, waypoints, tracklog in GPX and CSV formats, center on view, signal parameters, satellites used, calculate the distance between current location and the destination location.
- Graphic editing: create points, lines and polygons both GPS and hand based.
- Alphanumeric editing: customized forms.
- Vector representation: point/line/polygon symbology, thematic mapping, export to GML, KML and SHP.
- Tables: import fields from gvSIG Desktop.
- Project: Project storage, default properties (SRS, background colour, default project, icon size, ...).
- Others: data portability and data integration with gvSIG Desktop.
