= ISO 19123 =

The ISO 19123 series of standards defines a data and processing model for coverage data, which are digital representations of spatio-temporally extended phenomena, similar to fields (as in magnetic field) in physics. These standards are maintained by ISO TC211 Working Group 6 (WG6) Geospatial Imagery.

The 19123 suite consists of the adopted standards 19123-1, 19123-2, and 19123-3.

ISO 19123-4 is in preparation, it will address datacube tiling (as first introduced systematically by Paula Furtado).

19123-1 and 19123-2 together supersede the older 19123 specification, which is considered outdated and flawed.

== Specifications ==
=== 19123-1: Conceptual coverage data model ===
In 19123-1, the conceptual model of coverages is defined, introducing concepts and terminology. The purpose of these abstract definitions is to establish a common basis for concrete, interoperable data structures, such as 19123-2. Technically, this is expressed through a UML class model defining abstract interfaces. 19123-1 was published on June 2023, under the leadership of Liping Di.

=== 19123-2: Logical and physical coverage data model ===
The 19123-2 specification establishes the logical model of coverages by defining UML object classes with attributes. Clauses 5 through 10 specify this logical model, Clauses 11 and 12 define particular data encodings in XML and RDF, so physical models. Further encodings are provided through OGC standards, including GeoTIFF, NetCDF, JPEG2000, and others. 19123-2 was published on October 2026, under the leadership of Peter Baumann.

=== 19123-3: Conceptual coverage processing model ===
Purpose of 19123-3 is to provide a conceptual framework for coverage processing which allows describing coverage extraction, fusion, and analytics based on which coverage services can be described and compared. In an annex of 19123-3, an exemplary maping of the OGC Web Coverage Service (WCS) is described. 19123-3 was published on June 2023, under the leadership of Graham Wilkes and Peter Baumann.

As WG6 does not standardize services, coverage services like the OGC Web Coverage Service are not part of the 19123 suite.

=== 19123-4: Tiling ===
19123-4 is under development, under the leadership of Jinsongdi Yu.

== Relation to OGC coverage standards ==
ISO TC211 works in close synchronization with Open Geospatial Consortium (OGC) in geo standardization. Typically, both bodies mutually adopt standards to keep them synchronized. In case of coverages, standards have been mirrored as follows:

- ISO 19123-1:2023 has been adopted by OGC as Abstract Specification Topic 6.1;
- ISO 19123-2:2026 has been created from OGC CIS 1.0, OGC CIS 1.1, and OGC Referenceable Grid Extension; currently (November 2026) it is in the final stage of re-adoption as OGC CIS 1.2
- ISO 19123-3 has been adopted by OGC as Abstract Specification Topic 6.3

== Further information ==
- Coverage data in detail
- online overview, tutorials, background papers:
- Detail information: 19123-1/-2 coverage data model and 19123-3 processing model
