= National Geothermal Data System =

American geological data network

National Geothermal Data System (NGDS)
- Type: data
- Location: United States
- Protocols: WFS, WMS, ESRI Map Service, CSW
- Established: May 28, 2014
- Current status: operational
- Commercial?: No
- Funding: Original funding provided by United States Department of Energy

The National Geothermal Data System (NGDS) is an American distributed data network that collects and provides public access to digital geothermal exploration and development information. Data includes borehole temperature measurements, geothermal gradients, active faults, and geochemical analyses.

== History ==
NGDS was initially funded by the United States Department of Energy Geothermal Technologies Program (awards DE-EE0001120 and DE-EE002850), as part of the American Recovery and Reinvestment Act of 2009.

The National Geothermal Data System makes use of the large collection of hard copy documents stored in state geological survey archives. These documents include maps, field notes and well logs relevant to geothermal exploration and development. Some of the information was originally gathered for use by the oil industry. NGDS facilitates the digitization of this data, and ensures that data from various sources is stored in a compatible format to facilitate standardized search terms and geospatial analyses. Participating agencies maintain ownership and control of data they contribute.

Once digitized, the NGDS provides free public access to the data by means of a distributed network of online databases, and also provide the public with free and open-source software with which to search and view the data.

== Participating Agencies ==
NGDS primary contributors include the United States Geological Survey, Southern Methodist University, and the Association of American State Geologists.

Most agencies that contribute data to NGDS host their data on their own servers; some smaller agencies submit their data to contract-designated hubs, while still owning their data. NGDS hub states include Arizona, Illinois, Kentucky, and Nevada.

Participating agencies also submit metadata records to a central web-accessible catalog, describing the data that has been contributed to NGDS. Both NGDS data and the NGDS catalog can be accessed by common web browsers and web applications. NGDS data can also be accessed by geographic information system software applications including ArcGIS, UDig, QGIS, and GvSIG.
