= Coverage data =

Digital representation of spatio-temporal phenomenon

A coverage is the digital representation of some spatio-temporal phenomenon. ISO 19123 provides the definition:

- [a] feature that acts as a function to return values from its range for any direct position within its spatial, temporal or spatiotemporal domain

Coverages play an important role in geographic information systems (GIS), geospatial content and services, GIS data processing, and data sharing.

A coverage is represented by its "domain" (the universe of extent) and a collection representing the coverage's values at each defined location within its range. For example, a satellite image derived from remote sensing might record varying degrees of light pollution. Aerial photography, land cover data, and digital elevation models all provide coverage data. Generally, a coverage can be multi-dimensional, such as 1-D sensor timeseries, 2-D satellite images, 3-D x/y/t image time series or x/y/z geo tomograms, or 4-D x/y/z/t climate and ocean data.

However, coverages are more general than just regularly gridded imagery. The corresponding standards (see below) address regular and irregular grids, point clouds, and general meshes.

An interoperable service definition for navigating, accessing, processing, and aggregation of coverages is provided by the Open Geospatial Consortium (OGC) Web Coverage Service (WCS) suite and Web Coverage Processing Service (WCPS), a spatio-temporal coverage query language.

== Standards ==
Coverages represent digital geospatial information representing space/time-varying phenomena. OGC Abstract Topic 6 - which is identical to ISO 19123 - defines an abstract model of coverages. Many implementations are conceivable which all conform to this abstract model while not being interoperable. This abstract coverage model is concretized to the level of interoperability by the OGC standard GML 3.2.1 Application Schema - Coverages (often referred to as GMLCOV) which in turn is based on the Geography Markup Language (GML) 3.2, an XML grammar written in XML Schema for the description of application schemas as well as the transport and storage of geographic information.

The European legal framework for a unified Spatial Data Infrastructure, INSPIRE, in its Annex II and III relies on the OGC definitions of coverages as well, but modifies them in places in a way making them less compatible and interoperable with the OGC standard. For example, components of the coverage concept are selectively recombined into new, different definitions of a coverage.

== Coverage model ==
Formally, in GMLCOV AbstractCoverage is a subtype of AbstractFeature (indicating its close relation). An abstract coverage consists of the following components:

- coverage domain: the extent where valid values are available;
- range set: the set of values ("pixels", "voxels") the coverage consists of, together with their locations
- range type: a type definition of the range set values
- metadata: a slot where any kind of metadata can be added

This abstract coverage is refined into several concrete coverage types, which can be instantiated, for example:

- gridded coverages:
  - GridCoverage: a regular, equispaced grid which is not spatially referenced (like a raster image which has no geo coordinates associated)
  - RectifiedGridCoverage: a regular, equispaced grid which is spatially referenced (like a satellite image which does have geo coordinates associated)
  - ReferenceableGridCoverage: a grid which is not necessarily equispaced (like satellite image time series where images do not arrive at regular time intervals, or curvilinear grids following river estuaries)
- multi-feature coverages:
  - MultiPointCoverage: sets of values associated with points located in space/time ("point clouds")
  - MultiCurveCoverage: sets of values associated with curves located in space/time (such as trajectories)
  - MultiSurfaceCoverage: sets of values associated with surfaces located in space/time (such as iso-surfaces)
  - MultiSolidCoverage: sets of values associated with solids located in space/time (such as CAD objects)

Among the special cases which can be modeled by coverages are

- set of Thiessen polygons, used to analyse spatially distributed data such as rainfall measurements
- triangulated irregular network (TIN), often used for terrain models

== Relationship to features and fields ==
A coverage is related to both geographic features and geographic fields. ISO 19123-1 states:

Formally, a coverage itself is a subtype of a feature as defined in ISO 19101-1. The coverage feature is a set of features all sharing some key properties, such as the same attribute definition and coordinate reference system.

ISO 19109 (2nd Ed.) further explains the relationship between features and coverages as follows (clause 7.2.2):

Many aspects of the real-world may be represented as features whose properties are single-valued and static. These conventional features provide a model of the world in terms of discrete objects located in it. However, in some applications it is more useful to use a model focussing on the variation of property values in space and time, formalized as coverages.

ISO 19123-1 describes the relationship to fields as follows:

... the notion of coverages as digital representations of space-time varying phenomena, corresponding to the notion of a field in physics. Such coverages can be discrete or continuous. (...) A coverage which provides values only at the direct positions is called “a discrete coverage”. If interpolation information is added so that values can be obtained also between the coverage’s direct positions, such a coverage is called “a continuous coverage”. (...) In practice, coverages encompass regular and irregular grids, point clouds and general meshes. Examples include raster data, point clouds, meshes such as triangulated irregular networks and polygon sets.

Both viewpoints are required since they each express a fundamental meta-model of the world: as a space populated by things, or as a space within which properties vary. Furthermore, requirements relating to both viewpoints may occur in a single application, typically matching a data-flow: from observation through interpretation, and then elaboration and simulation.

== Coverage encoding ==
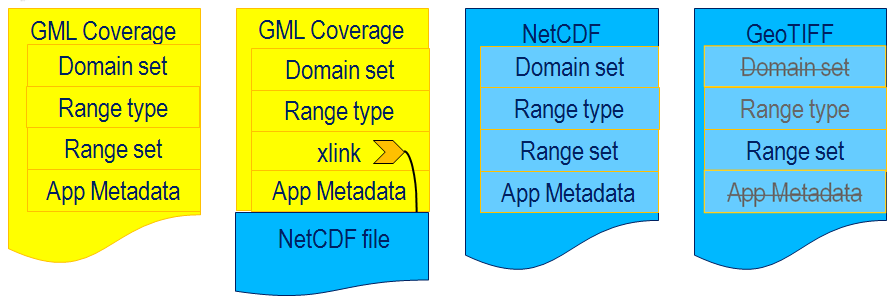
Different coverage encodings

The format-independent logical structure of coverages can be mapped to GML (such as for sensor time series) or to any of a series of data formats, such as GeoTIFF, NetCDF, HDF-EOS, or NITF.

As some of these encoding formats are not capable of incorporating all metadata making up a coverage, the coverage model foresees a multipart MIME encoding (see Figure) where the first component encodes the coverage description (domain extent, range type, metadata, etc.) and the second part consists of the range set "payload" using some encoding format.

== Services ==
In Web services following the open OGC standards, coverages can be used by various service types:

- Web Coverage Service which offers a simple access protocol for coverage subsetting, as well as optional advanced functionality
- Web Coverage Processing Service which offers a multi-dimensional coverage query language for ad hoc processing, fusion, aggregation, and filtering
- Web Feature Service (although coverages can only be served as a whole, making it unwieldy in face of the often high-volume coverages, like satellite maps)
- Web Processing Service which allows publishing any kind of algorithm through an advanced remote procedure call style protocol

== Industry Terminology: GIS format ==
Early GIS systems were often characterised as either 'raster' or 'vector' systems, depending on the underlying approach to handling geometry. Raster GIS could be interpreted as using a regular discrete coverage model, while Vector GIS are more feature-oriented. The term "coverage" was most notably applied to the legacy ARC/INFO (ArcInfo) format developed by ESRI. At that time this was a novel concept, extending CAD formats into more spatially aware data that featured linked attributes. This usage was consistent with the coverage concept discussed here, in the sense that an ArcInfo coverage provided a one-to-one mapping from space to the thematic value or classification for each layer or coverage. However, ArcInfo coverages had a particular topological approach to ensure completeness and uniqueness, processed using the BUILD and CLEAN commands are 2D planar datasets that maintain topological information, thus a polygon "knows" which segments of its perimeter it shares with adjacent polygons. Due to the lack of processing power in computing at the time of its development, the Coverage model employs indexed binary files to store spatial and attribute data separately as opposed to utilizing a RDBMS.

This has changed with the advent of raster database technology like rasdaman which makes efficient ad hoc filtering and processing feasible.

== See also ==
- Data cube
