= Mapbender =

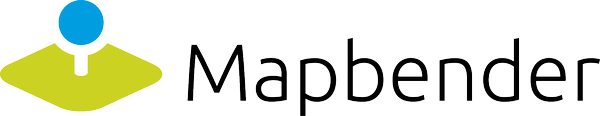
- Developer(s): Mapbender Developer Team
- Initial release: November 23, 2001
- Stable release: 4.1.3 / 24 June 2025; 58 days ago
- Repository: github.com/mapbender/mapbender
- Written in: PHP, HTML, JavaScript, JSON
- Platform: Cross-platform
- Available in: en, de, it, es, ru, nl, pt
- Type: Geographic information system
- License: MIT
- Website: mapbender.org/en/

Mapbender is a graduated project of the Open Source Geospatial Foundation. It was awarded OGC web site of the month in 2008. It is used by PortalU and several federal states to implement the INSPIRE regulation. Many municipalities use Mapbender as City Map Services and it is used as the mapping framework for online cycle route planners.

== Introduction ==
Mapbender is a web mapping software implemented in PHP and JavaScript, the configuration resides in a data model stored in a PostgreSQL PostGIS or MySQL database. It is developed as an open-source project and licensed by the GNU GPL as free software. Mapbender is a framework for managing spatial data services that are standardized following the OGC specifications OWS, WMS and WFS and using the formats GeoRSS and GML and Web Map Context. The framework implements user management, authentication and authorization. Management interfaces for user, group and service administration are stored as configurations in the database.

The software is used to display, overlay, edit and manage distributed Web Map Services. The maps themselves are generated by Server software. From this perspective Mapbender is a client software. The client interfaces are generated dynamically by PHP scripts on the Mapbender Server.

=== User Interface ===
User interfaces are created using forms of the same web based type. User interfaces contain elements (buttons, maps, legends, links), each has associated HTML attributes, path to PHP modules or JavaScript code which are stored in the database. Basic modules implement:

- zoom in and out
- pan map
- click and query (OGC WMS GetFeatureInfo)
- turn layers on and off
- move to coordinate (zoom to)
- get coordinate (mouse click)
- digitize (add new points, lines, polygons; this requires transactional WFS)
- load map services (OGC WMS)
- reorder and remove map services
- show legend
- print
- search interfaces
- store current map composition as OGC Web Map Context document

User interfaces can be started parameterized with a bounding box, set of services and set of activated layers.

=== Administration Interfaces ===
Administration interfaces are user interfaces with administration modules. This makes administration highly flexible and multi client capable (both multiple interfaces and user/group permission). Administration modules include management (add, edit, remove) of:

- users
- groups
- interfaces (GUI)
- WMS services
- WFS and transactional WFS services
- OWS Security Proxy
- Metadata
- Log and protocol
- Service monitor

== Categorization ==
Mapbender is designed to manage loosely coupled web services in a service-oriented architecture. Due to some glitches in early GIS history with Coordinate systems, Cartesian coordinate systems and Surveying this can sometimes be somewhat complex.

The Mapbender software covers the following topics:

- Web-GIS Client (OGC WMS, WFS, Catalog Service Client)
- Geo-CMS (Content Management System)
- Web-based map digitizing and editing functionality (OGC WFS-T Client)
- Service Meta Information Broker (ISO 19-hundred Series)
- Catalog System (ISO 19119 Service Meta Data)
- Security Management (Authentication, Authorization, SSO Secure Service)
- Accounting Management (Logging)
- Spatial Web Services Orchestrating
