= Styled Layer Descriptor =

XML schema describing layers on maps

In cartography, a Styled Layer Descriptor (SLD) is an XML schema specified by the Open Geospatial Consortium (OGC) for describing the appearance of map layers. It is capable of describing the rendering of vector and raster data. A typical use of SLDs is to instruct a Web Map Service (WMS) how to render a specific layer.

In August 2007 the OGC split an older SLD specification into two new OGC implementation specifications:

- Symbology Encoding (SE)
- Styled Layer Descriptor (SLD)

The Styled Layer Descriptor specification now only contains the protocol for communicating with a WMS about how to style a layer. The actual description of the styling is now exclusively described in the symbology encoding implementation specification.

== SLD-supporting software ==
=== Open source ===
Desktop software:

- OpenJUMP
- uDig
- AtlasStyler SLD editor
- Gaia
- QGIS
- SLD Editor
- SMASH (formerly known as Geopaparazzi)

Server-side software:

- deegree
- GeoServer
- MapServer
- Geomajas

=== Proprietary ===
Server-side software:

- Esri ArcGIS Server
- Ecere's GNOSIS Map Server

Client-side software:

- Ecere's GNOSIS Cartographer

== See also ==
- UDig
- GeoServer
