= MapServer =

Web mapping application development tool

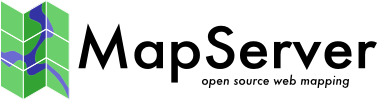
- Developers: Steve Lime originally, now a project of the Open Source Geospatial Foundation foundation
- Release: 1994
- Stable release: 8.6.5 / 10 July 2026; 49 days ago
- Written in: C / C++
- Platform: Cross-platform
- Type: GIS software (compare)
- License: X/MIT
- Website: mapserver.org
- Repository: github.com/MapServer/MapServer

MapServer is an open-source development environment for building spatially enabled internet applications, built in the C language, and is widely known as one of the fastest Web mapping engines available. It can run as a CGI program or via MapScript which supports several programming languages (using SWIG). MapServer can access hundreds of data formats, any raster or vector format supported by GDAL, and reprojections on-the-fly are handled by PROJ. MapServer was originally developed by Steve Lime, then working at the University of Minnesota — so, it was previously referred to as "UMN MapServer", to distinguish it from commercial "map servers"; today it is commonly referred to as just "MapServer", and is maintained by the MapServer Project Steering Committee (PSC). MapServer was originally developed with support from NASA, which needed a way to make its satellite imagery available to the public.

== Open Source Geospatial Foundation ==
In November 2005, Autodesk, the MapServer Technical Steering Committee Members, the University of Minnesota, and DM Solutions Group announced the creation of the MapServer Foundation. With this announcement, Autodesk announced that its internet mapping application, MapGuide, would be developed as an open source application with all new code and be named "MapServer Enterprise". The existing MapServer application would be renamed "MapServer Cheetah". This name change was overwhelmingly opposed by the MapServer community. Autodesk then backed off this name change and retained the name, "MapGuide" for its product. Also, plans to establish the MapServer Foundation were scrapped; Instead, the Open Source Geospatial Foundation (OSGeo) was established in 2006 to include MapServer and other open source GIS projects (which includes MapGuide Open Source).

== Timeline ==
MapServer has had an important role in Web mapping history. The following is a summary of its evolution:

- 1994: UMN awarded with NASA/ForNet funding to support web-based delivery of forestry data.
- 1997-07: MapServer 1.0, Developed as Part of the NASA ForNet Project. Grew out of the need to deliver remote sensing data across the web for foresters.
- 1998-07: MapServer 2.0 released as final ForNET deliverable; added reprojection support (PROJ.4).
- 1999: UMN makes MapServer an open source project.
- 2000-06: MapServer 3.0 was developed as part of the NASA TerraSIP Project. This is also the first public, open source release of UMN MapServer.
- 2001-06: MapServer 3.2 released with MapScript 1.0, like CSS, adds layout flexibility.
- 2002-06: MapServer 3.5 was rewritten, and added support for PostGIS and ArcSDE. Version 3.6 adds initial OGC WMS support.
- 2003-07: MapServer 4.0 released, adds 24bit raster output support and support for SWF.
- 2004-05: MapServer 4.2 released, adds support for SLD.
- 2004-11: MapServer 4.4 released, adds WCS support, FastCGI support, and i18n encoding for map labels.
- 2005-04: MapServer 4.6 released, adds support for SVG.
- 2007-09: MapServer 5.0 released, introducing Anti-Grain Geometry (AGG) graphics library.
- 2008-07: MapServer 5.2 released, adds WCS 1.1.x support, and native Microsoft SQL Server 2008 support.
- 2009-04: MapServer 5.4 released, adds OGC WMS 1.3.0 support.
- 2009-12: MapServer 5.6 released, adds support for XML mapfiles.
- 2011-05: MapServer 6.0 released, adds support for opengl & KML output, and built-in OpenLayers map viewer.
- 2012-11: MapServer 6.2 released, adds support for INSPIRE services. Released along TinyOWS and MapCache.
- 2013-09: MapServer 6.4 released, adds CMake support, contour rendering, layer geometry transformations.
- 2015-07: MapServer 7.0 released, adds heatmap layers, WFS 2.0 support, and layer-level character encoding.
- 2018-07: MapServer 7.2 released, adds MVT support, support for multi-line comments in the mapfile, and Python 3 support for MapScript.
- 2019-05: MapServer 7.4 released, adds PHP 7 MapScript support through SWIG, and initial PROJ 6 API support.
- 2020-05: MapServer 7.6 released, adds full support for PROJ 6 API, adds connection options in mapfile, and special character support in mapfiles on Windows.
- 2022-09: MapServer 8.0 released, adds native FlatGeobuf support, OGCAPI: Features support, new config file for MapServer, and PHP native MapScript removed, in place of PHPNG MapScript (through SWIG).
- 2024-07: MapServer 8.2 released, adds OGC API Features support, GitHub repository restructuring, and secures regex validation.
- 2025-01: MapServer 8.4 released, adds build support for PCRE2 library, new COMPOSITE.COMPOP blending operations, and CONNECTIONTYPE RASTERLABEL.
- 2025-12: MapServer 8.6 released, adds automatically generated index page to deployments, allow additional query parameters for OGCAPI: Features.

== See also ==
- GeoServer - an open-source server written in Java
- Mapnik - Open source mapping toolkit for desktop and server map rendering
- TopoQuest - Topographic map viewer using the technology
- Felt (GIS company) - Cloud-native mapping GIS platform
