= Rasdaman =

Database management system

rasdaman
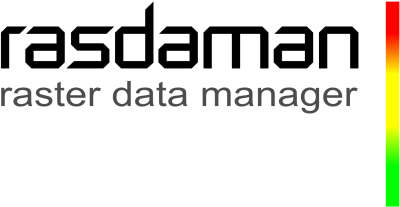
- Original author: Peter Baumann
- Developer: rasdaman GmbH
- Stable release: rasdaman v10.3 / March 13, 2024
- Written in: C++
- Operating system: Ubuntu
- Type: Array DBMS
- License: GPL v3 (server) / LGPL v3 (client) or proprietary
- Website: rasdaman.org, rasdaman.com
- Repository: rasdaman.org/rasdaman.git

rasdaman ("raster data manager") is an Array DBMS, that is: a Database Management System which adds capabilities for storage and retrieval of massive multidimensional arrays, such as sensor, image, simulation, and statistics data.

A frequently used synonym to arrays is raster data, such as in 2-D raster graphics; this actually has motivated the name rasdaman. However, rasdaman has no limitation in the number of dimensions - it can serve, for example, 1-D measurement data, 2-D satellite imagery, 3-D x/y/t image time series and x/y/z exploration data, 4-D ocean and climate data, and even beyond spatio-temporal dimensions.

== History ==
In 1989, Peter Baumann started research on database support for images, then at Fraunhofer Computer Graphics Institute. Following an in-depth investigation on raster data formalizations in imaging, in particular the AFATL Image Algebra, he established a database model for multidimensional arrays, including a data model and declarative query language. pioneering the field of Array Databases. Today, multidimensional arrays are also known as Data Cubes.

At the Technical University of Munich, in the EU funded basic research project RasDaMan, a first prototype was established, on top of the O2 object-oriented DBMS, and tested in Earth and Life science applications. Over further EU funded projects, this system was completed and extended to support relational DBMSs. A dedicated research spin-off, rasdaman GmbH, was established to give commercial support in addition to the research which subsequently has been continued at Jacobs University. Since then, both entities collaborate on the further development and use of the rasdaman technology.

== Concepts ==
=== Data model ===
Based on an array algebra specifically developed for database purposes, rasdaman adds a new attribute type, array, to the relational model. As this array definition is parametrized it constitutes a second-order construct or template; this fact is reflected by the second-order functionals in the algebra and query language.

For historical reasons, tables are called collections, as initial design emphasized an embedding into the object-oriented database standard, ODMG. Anticipating a full integration with SQL, rasdaman collections represent a binary relation with the first attribute being an object identifier and the second being the array. This allows the establishment of foreign key references between arrays and regular relational tuples.

=== Raster Query Language ===
The rasdaman query language, rasql, embeds itself into standard SQL and its set-oriented processing. On the new attribute type, multidimensional arrays, a set of extra operations is provided which all are based on a minimal set of algebraically defined core operators, an array constructor (which establishes a new array and fills it with values) and an array condenser (which, similarly to SQL aggregates, derives scalar summary information from an array). The query language is declarative (and, hence, optimizable) and safe in evaluation - that is: every query is guaranteed to return after a finite number of processing steps.

The rasql query guide provides details, here some examples may illustrate its use:

- "From all 4-D x/y/z/t climate simulation data cubes, a cutout which contains all in x, a y extract between 100 and 200, all available along z, and a slice at position 42 (effectively resulting in a 3-D x/y/z cube)":

select c[ *:*, 100:200, *:*, 42 ] 
from   ClimateSimulations as c

- "In all Landsat satellite images, suppress all non-green areas":

select img * (img.green > 130)
from   LandsatArchive as img

Note: This example illustrates a basic approach; practical vegetation analysis typically employs the NDVI formula, cloud masking, and additional processing techniques.

- "All MRI images where, in some region defined by the bit masks, intensity exceeds a threshold of 250":

select img
from   MRI as img, Masks as m
where  some_cells( img > 250 and m )

- "A 2-D x/y slice from all 4-D climate simulation data cubes, each one encoded in PNG format":

select png( c[ *:*, *:*, 100, 42 ] )
from   ClimateSimulations as c

== Architecture ==
=== Storage management ===
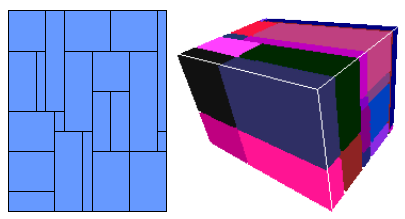
Sample array tiling in rasdaman

Raster objects are partitioned into tiles. Aside from a regular subdivision, any user or system generated partitioning is possible. As tiles form the unit of disk access, it is important that the tiling pattern is adjusted to the query access patterns; several tiling strategies assist in establishing a well-performing tiling. A geo index is employed to quickly determine the tiles affected by a query. Optionally, tiles are compressed using one of various choices, including lossless and lossy (wavelet) algorithms; independently of that, query results can be compressed for transfer to the client. Both tiling strategy and compression comprise database tuning parameters.

Tiles and tile index are stored on disk in the rasdaman database, together with the data dictionary needed by rasdaman's dynamic type system. For arrays larger than disk space, hierarchical storage management (HSM) support has been developed.

=== Query processing ===
Query execution is based on tile streaming. Execution follows a tile streaming paradigm: whenever possible, array tiles addressed by a query are fetched sequentially, and each tile is discarded after processing. This leads to an architecture scalable to data volumes exceeding server main memory by orders of magnitude.

Queries undergo heavy optimization. The server applies algebraic (heuristic) optimisation rules to the query tree where applicable; of the 150 algebraic rewriting rules, 110 are actually optimising while the other 40 serve to transform the query into canonical form. Further, cost-based optimization is applied. Parsing and optimization together take less than a millisecond on a laptop.

Further, queries get parallelized. Rasdaman offers inter-query parallelism (a dispatcher schedules requests into a pool of server processes on a per-transaction basis) and intra-query parallelism (transparent distribution of query subtrees across available cores, GPUs, or cloud nodes).

=== Client APIs ===
The primary interface to rasdaman is the query language. Embeddings into C++ and Java APIs allow invocation of queries, as well as client-side convenience functions for array handling. Arrays per se are delivered in the main memory format of the client language and processor architecture, ready for further processing. Data format codecs allow retrieving arrays in common raster formats, such as CSV, PNG, and NetCDF.

A Web design toolkit, raswct, is provided which makes the creation of Web query frontends easy, including graphical widgets for parametrized query handling, such as sliders for thresholds in queries.

=== Geo Web Services ===
A Java servlet, petascope, running as a rasdaman client offers Web service interfaces specifically for geo data access, processing and filtering. The following OGC standards are supported: WMS, WCS, WCPS, and WPS.

For WCS and WCPS, rasdaman is the reference implementation.

== Status and license model ==
Today, rasdaman is a fully-fledged implementation offering select / insert / update / delete array query functionality. It is being used in both research and commercial installations.

In a collaboration of the original code owner, rasdaman GmbH and Jacobs University, a code split was performed in from 2008 to 2009, resulting in rasdaman community, an open-source branch, and rasdaman enterprise, the commercial branch. Since then, rasdaman community is being maintained by Jacobs University whereas rasdaman enterprise remains proprietary to rasdaman GmbH. The difference between both variants mainly consists of performance boosters (such as specific optimization techniques) intended to support particularly large databases, user numbers, and complex queries; Details are available on the rasdaman community website.

The rasdaman community license releases the server in GPL and all client parts in LGPL, thereby allowing the use of the system in any kind of license environment.

== Impact ==
Being the first Array DBMS shipped (first prototype available in 1996), rasdaman has shaped this recent database research domain. Concepts of the data and query model (declarativeness, sometimes choice of operators) find themselves in more recent approaches. A deep comparison of Array DBMSs and related technology has been performed by the Research Data Alliance in 2018.

=== Standards ===
In 2008, the Open Geospatial Consortium released the Web Coverage Processing Service standard which defines a raster (often called "datacube") query language based on the concept of a coverage. Operator semantics is influenced by the rasdaman array algebra.

In 2016, INSPIRE (Legal Framework for Spatial Information in Europe) adopted WCPS as optional component of INSPIRE-WCS.

In 2023, WCPS has been adopted by ISO TC211 as ISO 19123-3:2023.

In 2024, OGC adopted the same specification as Abstract Topic 6.3.

In 2019, ISO adopted the rasql array query language as to the SQL standard, with only minor syntactic adjustments to SQL.

=== Project Use ===
Two selected projects may illustrate use of rasdaman in geo services.

The open Earth Datacube Playground is a showcase for actionable geo datacubes, offering 1-D through 4-D use cases of raster data access and ad-hoc processing. The showcase is built using rasdaman.

EarthServer is a global federation of independent datacube providers. The combined datacube offerings are made available as a single, homogenized datacube space. Access is completely location transparent: any node can receive a query and answer it, regardless on which federation node the data sit; this includes automatic distributed data fusion. Participation is free for datacube contributors.
