= Web Map Tile Service =

Web protocol

WMTS
- Developed by: OGC
- Initial release: 2010
- Type of format: Container format
- Container for: XML, JPEG, PNG, others
- Open format?: Yes, with Copyright

A Web Map Tile Service (WMTS) is a standard protocol for serving pre-rendered or run-time computed georeferenced map tiles over the Internet. The specification was developed and first published by the Open Geospatial Consortium in 2010.

== History ==
The Open Geospatial Consortium (OGC) became involved in developing standards for web mapping after a paper was published in 1997 by Allan Doyle, outlining a "WWW Mapping Framework". The oldest and most popular standard for web mapping is WMS. However, the properties of this standard proved to be difficult to implement for situations where short response times were important. For most WMS services it is not uncommon to require 1 or more CPU seconds to produce a response. For massive parallel use cases, such a CPU-intensive service is not practical. To overcome the CPU intensive on-the-fly rendering problem, application developers started using pre-rendered map tiles. Several open and proprietary schemes were invented to organize and address these map tiles. An earlier specification for this is the Tile Map Service (TMS). It is simpler than WMTS. It was developed by members of the OSGeo and is not backed by an official standards body.

== Requests ==
WMTS specifies a number of request encodings:

KVP
key-value-pairs encoding (over HTTP)
REST
Representational state transfer encoding (over HTTP)
SOAP
Simple Object Access Protocol encoding (usually over HTTP)

The syntax for the WMTS request types is different for each of these encodings. Some request types are:

Capabilities
returns information about the WMTS service parameters
Tile
returns a map tile
FeatureInfo
returns (alphanumeric) information for a given map location
Legend
returns a legend image for the map

== See also ==
- Open Source Geospatial Foundation (OSGeo)
- Tile Map Service (TMS)
- Tiled web map
- Web Coverage Service (WCS)
- Web Feature Service (WFS)
- Web Map Service (WMS)
