= Cadcorp =

Software company in United Kingdom

Cadcorp Limited
- Company type: Private
- Industry: Software; Geographic Information Systems (GIS)
- Founded: Bedford, Bedfordshire (1991; 35 years ago)
- Headquarters: Stevenage, Hertfordshire, U.K. 51°53′50.70″N 0°12′21.52″W
- Products: Cadcorp SIS Desktop; Cadcorp GeognoSIS; Cadcorp SIS WebMap
- Owner: NEC Software Solutions UK
- Website: www.cadcorp.com

Cadcorp Limited is a British company established in 1991. Based in Stevenage, Hertfordshire, U.K., it has a network of distributors and value added resellers (VARs) around the world.

Cadcorp is an ISO 9001:2000 and ISO/IEC 27001:2005 certified company, a Microsoft SQL Server Spatial Partner, an Ordnance Survey Licensed Developer Partner, and a corporate member of the Association for Geographic Information in the UK.

== History ==
Cadcorp's first product was a Microsoft Windows-based CAD system called Wincad. All rights to the product were sold in 1994. Wincad development and maintenance, carried out latterly by Informatix Inc, Japan, through their UK subsidiary under the brand name MicroGDS, was stopped in March 2013.

After selling Wincad, Cadcorp moved on to developing geographic information system (GIS) software. The first version of Cadcorp SIS – Spatial Information System ("Cadcorp SIS") was released in 1995.

The leadership team successfully completed a management buyout of the company in May 2015.

In August 2025, NEC Software Solutions UK completed the acquisition of Cadcorp.

== Market ==
Cadcorp SIS has applications in the following UK markets

- Government (local, municipal and central)
- Emergency Services
- Land and Property
- Insurance
- Oil and Gas
- Utilities
- Maritime
- Environment
- National Mapping Agencies

== Products ==
In July 2020, Cadcorp SIS continued its support for data items of the Ordnance Survey (OS). Cadcorp SIS links directly to the Ordnance Survey Data Hub. It has dedicated guides for linking to the OS Features API, the OS Maps API and the OS Vector Tile API. Both the OS Maps API and the OS Vector Tile API are used in the British National Grid and the coordinate database structures for "Web Mercator".

== Open geospatial consortium ==
Cadcorp has been a member of the Open Geospatial Consortium (OGC) since 1997. In 2004, Cadcorp's technical director, Martin Daly was awarded the OGC Kenneth G. Gardels Award, made annually to an individual who has made outstanding contributions to advancing the OGC vision of geographic information fully integrated into the world's information systems.

Several versions of the Cadcorp SIS product suite are certified OGC compliant in the categories of:

- Simple Features for OLE/COM
- Grid Coverage Service
- Coordinate Transformation Service
- Web Map Service
- Web Feature Service

Cadcorp SIS also implements support for:

- Web Map Context Documents
- Geography Markup Language
- Simple Features
- Web Coverage Service

== Product overview ==
Cadcorp SIS is available in different forms:

- desktop
- server
- web mapping
- cloud hosting
- developer tools
- specialised applications

== GIS data management tool ==
In February 2020, Cadcorp SIS ETL (Extract, Transform, Load) is the newest contribution to a broad variety of vertical technologies unique to Cadcorp.

In May 2020, Cadcorp also expanded its cloud services to include SIS Desktop, with the increasing growth of cloud computing technologies.
