= Multidimensional analysis =

Data analysis process

In statistics, econometrics and related fields, multidimensional analysis (MDA) is a data analysis process that groups data into two categories: data dimensions and measurements. For example, a data set consisting of the number of wins for a single football team at each of several years is a single-dimensional (in this case, longitudinal) data set. A data set consisting of the number of wins for several football teams in a single year is also a single-dimensional (in this case, cross-sectional) data set. A data set consisting of the number of wins for several football teams over several years is a two-dimensional data set.

== Higher dimensions ==
In many disciplines, two-dimensional data sets are also called panel data. While, strictly speaking, two- and higher-dimensional data sets are "multi-dimensional", the term "multidimensional" tends to be applied only to data sets with three or more dimensions. For example, some forecast data sets provide forecasts for multiple target periods, conducted by multiple forecasters, and made at multiple horizons. The three dimensions provide more information than can be gleaned from two-dimensional panel data sets.

== Software ==
Computer software for MDA include Online analytical processing (OLAP) for data in relational databases, pivot tables for data in spreadsheets, and Array DBMSs for general multi-dimensional data (such as raster data) in science, engineering, and business.

== See also ==
- MultiDimensional eXpressions (MDX)
- Multidimensional panel data
- Multivariate statistics
- Dimension (data warehouse)
- Dimension tables
- Data cube
