= Data cube =

Multi-dimensional data structure

In computer programming, a data cube (or datacube) is a multi-dimensional array of values. Typically, the term "data cube" is applied in contexts where these arrays are massively larger than the hosting computer's main memory; examples include multi-terabyte/petabyte data warehouses and time series of image data. Even though it is called a cube, a data cube generally is a multi-dimensional concept which can be 1-dimensional, 2-dimensional, 3-dimensional, or higher-dimensional.

The data cube is used to represent data (sometimes called facts) along some dimensions of interest. In satellite image time series, dimensions would be latitude and longitude coordinates and time; a fact (sometimes called measure) would be a pixel in the satellite image at a given space and time as taken by the satellite. For example, in online analytical processing, an OLAP cube about a company would have dimensions that could be the company subsidiaries, the company products, and time; in this setup, a fact would be a sales event where a particular product has been sold in a particular subsidiary at a particular time.

In any case, every dimension divides data into groups of cells whereas each cell in the cube represents a single measure of interest. Sometimes cubes hold only a few values with the rest being empty, i.e. undefined, while sometimes most or all cube coordinates hold a cell value. In the first case such data are called sparse, and in the second case they are called dense, although there is no hard delineation between the two.

Data cubes may be stored in database management systems (DBMS) as part of array DBMS. Spatio-temporal databases and geospatial databases may also be represented as coverage data.

== History ==
Multi-dimensional arrays have long been familiar in programming languages. Fortran offers arbitrarily-indexed 1-D arrays and arrays of arrays, which allows the construction of higher-dimensional arrays, up to 15 dimensions. APL supports n-D arrays with a rich set of operations. All these have in common that arrays must fit into the main memory and are available only while the particular program maintaining them (such as image processing software) is running.

A series of data exchange formats support storage and transmission of data cube-like data, often tailored towards particular application domains. Examples include MDX for statistical (in particular, business) data, Zarr and Hierarchical Data Format for general scientific data, and TIFF for imagery.

In 1992, Peter Baumann introduced management of massive data cubes with high-level user functionality combined with an efficient software architecture. Datacube operations include subset extraction, processing, fusion, and in general queries in the spirit of data manipulation languages like SQL.

Some years after, the data cube concept was applied to describe time-varying business data as data cubes by Jim Gray, et al., and by Venky Harinarayan, Anand Rajaraman and Jeff Ullman.

Around that time, a working group on Multi-Dimensional Databases ("Arbeitskreis Multi-Dimensionale Datenbanken") was established at German Gesellschaft für Informatik.

Datacube Inc. was an image processing company selling hardware and software applications for the PC market in 1996, however without addressing data cubes as such.

The EarthServer initiative has established geo data cube service requirements.

== Standardization ==
In 2018, the ISO SQL database language was extended with data cube functionality as "SQL – Part 15: Multi-dimensional arrays (SQL/MDA)".

Web Coverage Processing Service is a geo data cube analytics language issued by the Open Geospatial Consortium in 2008. In addition to the common data cube operations, the language knows about the semantics of space and time and supports both regular and irregular grid data cubes, based on the concept of coverage data.

An industry standard for querying business data cubes, originally developed by Microsoft, is MultiDimensional eXpressions.

== Implementation ==
Many high-level computer languages treat data cubes and other large arrays as single entities distinct from their contents. These languages, of which Fortran, APL, IDL, NumPy, PDL, and S-Lang are examples, allow the programmer to manipulate complete film clips and other data en masse with simple expressions derived from linear algebra and vector mathematics. Some languages (such as PDL) distinguish between a list of images and a data cube, while many (such as IDL) do not.

Array DBMSs (Database Management Systems) offer a data model which generically supports definition, management, retrieval, and manipulation of n-dimensional data cubes. This database category has been pioneered by the rasdaman system since 1994.

== Applications ==
Multi-dimensional arrays can meaningfully represent spatio-temporal sensor, image, and simulation data, but also statistics data where the semantics of dimensions is not necessarily of spatial or temporal nature. Generally, any kind of axis can be combined with any other into a data cube.

=== Mathematics ===
In mathematics, a one-dimensional array corresponds to a vector, a two-dimensional array resembles a matrix; more generally, a tensor may be represented as an n-dimensional data cube.

=== Science and engineering ===
For a time sequence of color images, the array is generally four-dimensional, with the dimensions representing image X and Y coordinates, time, and RGB (or other color space) color plane. For example, the EarthServer initiative unites data centers from different continents offering 3-D x/y/t satellite image timeseries and 4-D x/y/z/t weather data for retrieval and server-side processing through the Open Geospatial Consortium WCPS geo data cube query language standard.

A data cube is also used in the field of imaging spectroscopy, since a spectrally-resolved image is represented as a three-dimensional volume. Earth observation data cubes combine satellite imagery such as Landsat 8 and Sentinel-2 with Geographic information system analytics.

=== Business intelligence ===
In online analytical processing (OLAP), data cubes are a common arrangement of business data suitable for analysis from different perspectives through operations like slicing, dicing, pivoting, and aggregation.

== See also ==
- Array DBMS
- rasdaman
- OLAP cube
- Australian Geoscience Data Cube
- Graph (discrete mathematics)
- Abstract semantic graph
- Apache Kylin
