= Peter Baumann (computer scientist) =

German computer scientist

- Education: TU Munich
- Known for: Datacubes, Array DBMS
- Scientific career
- Workplaces: TU Darmstadt; TU Munich; Constructor (formerly: Jacobs) University
- Thesis: A conceptual information model for visualization databases (1993)
- Doctoral advisor: José Luis Encarnação

Peter Baumann, born 1960 in Rosenheim, is a German computer scientist and professor at Constructor (formerly: Jacobs) University, Bremen, Germany, where he is head of the Large-Scale Scientific Information Systems Research Group in the Department of Computer Science and Electrical Engineering.

== Career ==
Baumann obtained a diploma in Computer Science (1987) from Technical University of Munich, a doctorate (1993) in Computer Science from the Department of Computer Science of the Technische Universität Darmstadt while working with the Fraunhofer Computer Graphics Institute. He has pursued post-doctoral activities in both industry and academia, working for Softlab Group in Munich (now Cirquent) and as Assistant Head of the Knowledge Bases Research Group of FORWISS (Bavarian Research Center for Knowledge-based Systems) / Technical University of Munich where he was deputy to Prof. Rudolf Bayer, Ph.D.

In 2004, he was appointed Professor of Computer Science at Constructor (formerly: Jacobs) University, Bremen, where he continues teaching and researching with his research group.

Among Baumann's entrepreneurial activities is the spin-off company rasdaman GmbH which he still leads today as CEO, established for the commercialization of the world's first multi-dimensional Array DBMS, rasdaman.

== Research ==
3-D cutout from an x/y/t satellite image timeseries datacube of approx. 10,000 AVHRR images

Baumann's current research interests include scalable database and Web service support for large, multi-dimensional arrays, including algebraic modeling, query language, query optimization, system architecture, and applications such as earth sciences and life sciences. As part of this research, standardization of geo raster services is being addressed. As such, it is related to dimensional databases, however with a distinct focus on spatio-temporal, multi-dimensional raster graphics data, rather than business data.

Concepts are implemented and in practical use with the rasdaman Array DBMS.

== Impact ==
=== Array Databases ===
Baumann is inventor and Principal Architect of the rasdaman Array DBMS, the historically first database engine for large, multi-dimensional arrays, also known as datacubes. By contributing theory, implementation, application, and standardization he has pioneered Array Databases as a distinct research field.

He has authored and co-authored 250+ journal and conference papers, has given scientific talks and tutorials worldwide, and holds international patents on array database technology.

=== Standardization ===
Baumann is active in several bodies concerned with scientific Big Data access and use:

- Initiator and editor of a series of adopted international standards:
  - ISO/IEC:
    - initiator and co-editor, ISO/IEC SQL Multi-Dimensional Arrays extension
  - ISO TC211 (via Deutsches Institut für Normung):
    - editor, ISO TC211 19123-1, 19123-2, and 19123-3
  - OGC (as co-chair, OGC Coverages Domain Working Group (Coverages.DWG), Coverages.SWG, and Big Data Domain Working Group (BigData.DWG)):
    - editor, OGC Web Coverage Service (WCS) standards suite
    - editor, OGC Abstract Specification Topic 6.1 and Abstract Specification Topic 6.3
    - editor, WCPS geodatacube query language
- board member, United Nations Committee of Experts on Global Geospatial Information Management (UNGGIM) Private Sector Network (PSN);
- Open Source Geospatial Foundation (OSGeo) Charter Member no. 176
- past chair, IEEE Geoscience and Remote Sensing Society (GRSS) Earth Science Informatics (ESI)

=== Awards ===
For the invention, commercialization, and standardization impact Baumann has received a series of international innovation awards, including: Excellence in Scientific Innovation Award 2026, DIN Innovator Award 2019, TechConnect World Innovation Award 2019, NATO Defence Innovation Challenge Award 2018, Copernicus Masters Competition Winner 2014, Open Geospatial Consortium Kenneth Gardels Award 2014, and several more.
