= NGDS =

NGDS may refer to:

- National Gamete Donation Service, a British organization for sperm, egg and embryo donation
- National Geothermal Data System, an American geothermal data network
- NGD Studios, a former name of the Argentine video game developer Nimble Giant Entertainment
- Ninja Gaiden: Dragon Sword, a 2008 video game
