= Compton Tucker =

Earth scientist and academic

- Education: BS., Biology; MS., Systems Ecology, Natural Resource Ecology Laboratory; PhD., Systems Ecology, Natural Resource Ecology Laboratory
- Alma mater: Colorado State University
- Occupations: Earth scientist and academic
- Scientific career
- Workplaces: NASA Goddard Space Flight Center

Compton Tucker is an Earth scientist and academic. He is a Senior Earth Scientist in the Laboratory for Hydrospheric and Biospheric Sciences at NASA Goddard Space Flight Center in the Earth Science Division in Greenbelt, Maryland, USA.

Tucker is most known for his work on satellite-based time-series monitoring of vegetation for global studies including photosynthesis, land cover, droughts, food security, weather-linked disease outbreaks, forest conditions, deforestation, land degradation, and carbon in semi-arid trees.

He was elected a Member of the National Academy of Sciences in 2025.

== Education ==
Tucker earned a B.S. in Biology in 1969 from Colorado State University. He later received an M.S. in 1973 and a Ph.D. in 1975, both in Systems Ecology, from the Natural Resource Ecology Laboratory in the Department of Forestry at Colorado State University.

== Career ==
Tucker began his professional career as a National Academy of Sciences Postdoctoral Fellow at the NASA Goddard Space Flight Center from 1975 to 1977, subsequently holding the position of Physical Scientist at the Hydrospheric and Biospheric Sciences Laboratory from 1977 to 1992, when he was appointed a Senior Scientist. From 2005 to 2010, he was the NASA representative to the U.S. Global Change Research Program. Concurrently, he worked in NASA's Space Archaeology Program from 2001 to 2012, conducting ground-penetrating radar and ground magnetic surveys at Troy, in the Granicus River Valley, and at Gordion, all in Turkey. Since 2012, he focused on his satellite mapping work and in 2014, he became involved in NASA's Commercial Satellite Data activities, quantifying semi-arid woody biomass at the tree level.

Tucker has testified twice: in 1994, before the House Committee on Foreign Affairs's Subcommittee on the Western Hemisphere regarding Indigenous peoples and the Amazon Basin of Brazil; and in 2009 to the House Appropriations Subcommittee for Commerce, Justice, and Science concerning satellite observations needed to understand the role of land vegetation in weather and climate. He has appeared on TV channels including PBS, BBC, CBS Canada, Bay News 9, and TV1 in Sweden as well as radio channels including National Public Radio, Aspen Public Radio, Australian Radio National “Breakfast”, including coverage for NASA's Dinosaur-Mammal Cretaceous Rosetta Stone and online programs like the Kennedy Center's "Reach to Forests" in 2024.

Tucker is an adjunct professor at the University of Maryland and is a Consulting Scholar at the University Museum of the University of Pennsylvania.

== Research ==
Tucker's M.S. and Ph.D. work involved the collection and analysis of grassland hyperspectral and supporting biological data from the Pawnee Intensive Site of the Grassland Biome under Lee D. Miller. The hyperspectral studies allowed a quantitative method to select spectral regions to study vegetation and also led to a hand-held 2-band radiometer.

Tucker put his hyperspectral band selection to work, collaborating with Stan Schneider of NOAA in 1976 to restrict the Advanced Very-High Resolution Radiometer's (AVHRR) first band to the 550 nm to 700 nm bandwidth, from its previous wavelength range of 550 nm to 1000 nm. The 550 to 700 nm band with the instruments’ near-infrared band enabled producing AVHRR NDVI data from the NOAA series of meteorological satellites, starting with NOAA-6 in 1978 and continuing to NOAA-19, and additionally with MetOps-1, -2, & -3. He also utilized the hyperspectral data for band selection for the Thematic Mapper instruments for Landsat-4 and -5, consolidating two redundant near-infrared bands into one near-infrared band that enabled adding a second shortwave infrared band to the same instruments.

The hand-held red and near-infrared radiometer was used by Tucker and colleagues at NASA collecting field data in 1978 that showed the time integral of NDVI was directly related to gross primary production. He then used 1 km NOAA Advanced Very High-Resolution Radiometer (AVHRR) 1981 imagery from Senegal to show NOAA-7 satellite-NDVI was also directly related to gross primary production from grass-dominated savannas. He began processing daily 4 km AVHRR imagery from Africa at the same time as these data were inexpensive and could be formed into composites to minimize clouds for $20/day. This work then expanded to the Earth's land area.

Tucker contributed to the field of Earth science by using NOAA AVHRR NDVI satellite data and Landsat data to study global photosynthesis, vegetation phenology, land cover, famine early warning, drought monitoring, ecologically coupled disease outbreaks, forest condition, deforestation, land & forest degradation, and glacier extent.

In his most highly cited work, Tucker employed the in situ hyperspectral data to demonstrate the effectiveness of infrared and red linear combinations for monitoring photosynthetically active biomass in plant canopies. In 1985, he collaborated with John Townshend utilizing NOAA's AVHRR data to monitor African land cover revealing correlations with rainfall and enabling land cover classification and primary production estimates. The following year, with I.Y. Fung, C.D. Keeling, and R.H. Gammon, he showed that satellite-derived estimates of radiation absorbed by vegetation correlated with surface CO_{2} concentrations, suggesting their utility in estimating global terrestrial photosynthesis.

Tucker's research broadened to continental and global studies since 1986, and he worked with Ranga Myneni, Rama Nemani, Steven Running, Inez Fung, Jorge Pinzon, Piers Sellers, Joseph Berry, David Randall, Seitse Los, Wolfgang Bauermann and Assaf Anyamba. Since 2018, he has worked with Martin Brandt, Ankit Kariyaa, and Pierre Hiernaux on mapping individual trees, culminating in a paper that analyzed over 9.9 billion trees in semi-arid sub-Saharan Africa, determining the carbon content of every tree using satellite imagery and field allometry, and provided a database useful for carbon accounting, ecological protection, and dryland ecosystem restoration efforts.

== Awards and honors ==
- 1987 – Exceptional Scientific Achievement Medal, NASA
- 1992 – Henry Shaw Medal, Missouri Botanical Garden
- 1993 – Michael Collins Trophy for Current Achievement, National Air and Space Museum
- 1997 – William T. Pecora Award, U.S. Geological Survey
- 2004 – Galathea Medal, Royal Danish Geographical Society
- 2009 – Fellow, American Geophysical Union
- 2014 – Vega Medal, Swedish Society of Anthropology and Geography
- 2015 – Fellow, American Association for the Advancement of Science
- 2017 – Senior Executive Service Presidential Rank Award for Meritorious Service, U.S. federal government

== Selected articles ==
- Tucker, C. J., & Garratt, M. W. (1977). Leaf optical system modeled as a stochastic process. Applied Optics, 16(3), 635–642.
- Tucker, C. J. (1979). Red and photographic infrared linear combinations for monitoring vegetation. Remote Sensing of Environment, 8(2), 127–150.
- Tucker, C. J., Townshend, J. R., & Goff, T. E. (1985). African land-cover classification using satellite data. Science, 227(4685), 369–375.
- Tucker, C. J., & Sellers, P. J. (1986). Satellite remote sensing of primary production. International Journal of Remote Sensing, 7(11), 1395–1416.
- Tucker, C. J., Fung, I. Y., Keeling, C. D., & Gammon, R. H. (1986). Relationship between atmospheric CO_{2} variations and a satellite-derived vegetation index. Nature, 319(6050), 195–199.
- Skole, D., & Tucker, C. (1993). Tropical deforestation and habitat fragmentation in the Amazon: satellite data from 1978 to 1988. Science, 260(5116), 1905–1910.
- Steininger, M. K., Tucker, C. J., Townshend, J. R., Killeen, T. J., Desch, A., Bell, V., & Ersts, P. (2001). Tropical deforestation in the Bolivian Amazon. Environmental Conservation, 28(2), 127–134.
- Anyamba, A., Small, J. L., Britch, S. C., Tucker, C. J., Pak, E. W., Reynolds, C. A., ... & Linthicum, K. J. (2014). Recent weather extremes and impacts on agricultural production and vector-borne disease outbreak patterns. PloS ONE, 9(3), e92538.
- Brandt, M., Tucker, C. J., Kariryaa, A., Rasmussen, K., Abel, C., Small, J., ... & Fensholt, R. (2020). An unexpectedly large count of trees in the West African Sahara and Sahel. Nature, 587(7832), 78–82.
- Tucker, C., Brandt, M., Hiernaux, P., Kariryaa, A., Rasmussen, K., Small, J., ... & Fensholt, R. (2023). Sub-continental-scale carbon stocks of individual trees in African drylands. Nature, 615(7950), 80–86.
