= SDF3 =

SDF3 may refer to:

- Spatial data file 3, a geodatabase file format
- SDF-3 Pioneer, a fictional spacecraft from the animated series Robotech
