= OGC =

OGC may refer to:

- Oculogyric crisis, a dystonic reaction to certain drugs and/or medical conditions
- Office of Government Commerce, a department of the government of the United Kingdom
- O.G.C. (band), a hip hop group from Brooklyn, New York
- OGC Nice French association football club based in Nice
- Open Geospatial Consortium, a standards organization for geospatial information systems
- Oregon Graduate Center, a private college in suburban Portland, Oregon
- Organic Christ Generation, a sect in Switzerland
- Organically Grown Company (Oregon), an organic produce wholesale company
- OceanaGold, TSX ticker symbol OGC
