= EmissionML =

Open data modeling standard

EmissionML (Emission Event Modeling Language) is an open and interoperable ontology and data model standard developed by the Open Geospatial Consortium (OGC) to enable consistent representation, sharing, and integration of emission event data across sectors and technologies. It provides a machine-readable, spatio-temporal data model for describing the release of pollutants into the atmosphere, making it easier to trace, audit, and reconcile emission reports with observational data sources.

== History ==
EmissionML was initiated in 2024 through the formal proposal of an OGC Standards Working Group (SWG). The proposal is open for public comment in August 2024. The EmissionML SWG was officially launched at the 132nd OGC Technical Committee meeting in Mérida, Mexico, in June 2025.

In June 2025, the EmissionML SWG also welcomed collaboration with the Open Footprint Forum, with both standards seen as complementary: EmissionML focuses on raw emission event modeling, while the Open Footprint Data Model emphasizes corporate footprint accounting.
