= Tile Map Service =

Specification for tiled web maps

TMS
- Developed by: OSGeo
- Initial release: 2006
- Type of format: Container format
- Container for: XML, JPEG, PNG
- Open format?: Yes: GNU LGPL

Tile Map Service or TMS, is a specification for tiled web maps, developed by the Open Source Geospatial Foundation. The definition generally requires a URI structure which attempts to fulfill REST principles. The TMS protocol fills a gap between the very simple standard used by OpenStreetMap and the complexity of the Web Map Service standard, providing simple urls to tiles while also supporting alternate spatial referencing system.

== Support ==
TMS is most widely supported by web mapping clients and servers; although there is some desktop support, the Web Map Service protocol is more widespread for enterprise mapping applications. The OpenLayers JavaScript library supports TMS natively, while the Google Maps API allows URL templating, which makes support possible for developers. TileCache is one of the most popular supporting servers, while other servers like mod tile and TileLite focus on the de facto OpenStreetMap standard.

== WMTS ==
TMS served as the basis for the OpenGIS Web Map Tile Service OGC standard.

== See also ==
- Tiled web map
