= Weather Information Exchange Model =

The Weather Information Exchange Model (WXXM) is a platform that was originally designed by EUROCONTROL for the exchange of weather related information between users.

It is now a proposed standard of the Open Geospatial Consortium (OGC) and is used by both Eurocontrol and the FAA.
