= GeoMedia =

- Developer: Hexagon Geospatial
- Stable release: 2015.1 / March 2015
- Preview release: 2016 / May 2015
- Operating system: x64 editions of Windows 7, Windows 8, Windows 8.1 and Windows Server 2012; works on Windows XP and later (may be not supported)
- Type: GIS
- License: Proprietary
- Website: supportsi.hexagon.com/s/geomedia?language=en_US&tabset-4b318=2

Hexagon Geospatial's (a division of Intergraph Corporation) GeoMedia Professional is a geographic information system (GIS) management solution for map generation and the analysis of geographic information with smart tools that capture and edit spatial data. GeoMedia is used for: creating geographic data; managing geospatial databases; joining business data, location intelligence and geographic data together; creating hard and soft-copy maps; conduct analysis in 'real-time'; base platform for multiple applications, geographic data validation, publishing geospatial information and analyzing mapped information.

The GeoMedia family consists of 17 applications tailored for regional and local government, national and federal government, military and intelligence, utilities, communications, photogrammetry and transportation markets.

The system does not rely on proprietary data, but rather accesses and uses data sources directly or data that adheres to open standards such as those defined by the Open Geospatial Consortium and others. It is an enterprise-based system, providing an organization the ability to access, conduct analysis and distribute information through the organization or over the Web.

GeoMedia includes the following Windows desktop software:

- GeoMedia Viewer, a free application which allows for map display, simple analysis and output of GeoMedia GeoWorkspace data. It is intended as a distribution mechanism for data created using GeoMedia products;
- GeoMedia is licensed under three functional tiers:
  - GeoMedia Essentials, allows for dynamic, complex and ad hoc query and perform basic spatial analysis of vector geospatial data across various data sources as well as create layered maps;
  - GeoMedia Advantage, adds to the functionality of Essentials by adding terrain and grid functions which will allow for additional analysis on digital elevation models, flow analysis and contour line generation; or
  - GeoMedia Professional, includes added capability to collect features, linear referencing management, quality assurance and validation tools as well as database schema mapping and management.

Besides the desktop platform, there are also server-based GeoMedia products as well as GeoMedia products for various mobile devices to include smartphones and tablet computers. Optional extensions can be acquired separately to increase the functionality of GeoMedia.

== History ==
GeoMedia was developed under the Intergraph Corporation. However, on December 2, 2013, Intergraph Security, Government and Infrastructure split its divisions and rebranded as Hexagon Geospatial. The GeoMedia software and resources are currently hosted on the Hexagon website.

== Product Overview ==
GeoMedia has received peer reviews in specialist geographic information system publications.GeoMedia 5 has been discussed in GIS Monitor for improving performance and analytical capabilities of the software, such as the new topology engine that gave the software better spatial operation processing. A later review by GIS Geography was conducted to determine the interoperability, the database support, the documentation and ease of use of the software, highlighting what it can do and what it cannot.

GeoMedia has also been tested for use in transportation and engineering research. Auburn University's Highway Research Center and the Alabama Department of Transportation conducted a study, which involved a hydrological analysis of GeoMedia and Intergraph's Modular GIS Environment based on methods developed by the Natural Resources Conservation Service.
