= Satellite image time series =

Satellite images taken from the same scene at different times

A satellite image time series (SITS) is a set of satellite images taken from the same scene at different dates, forming multiple time series of pixels. A SITS makes use of different satellite sources to obtain a larger data series with short time interval between two images. In this case, it is fundamental to observe the spatial resolution and image registration constraints.

Satellite observations offer opportunities for understanding how Earth is changing, for determining the causes of these changes, and for predicting future changes. Remotely sensed data, combined with information from ecosystem models, offers an opportunity for predicting and understanding the behavior of the Earth's ecosystem.

Satellite sensors with high spatial and temporal resolutions make the observation of precise spatio-temporal structures in dynamic scenes more accessible. Temporal components integrated with spectral and spatial dimensions allow the identification of complex patterns concerning applications connected with environmental monitoring and analysis of land use/land cover dynamics. The input big data is often organized as data cubes.
