= Spatial Data File =

Type of file format

The Spatial Data File (SDF) is a single-user geodatabase file format developed by Autodesk. The file format is the native spatial data storage format for Autodesk GIS programs MapGuide and AutoCAD Map 3D. As of 2014 SDF format version SDF3 (based on SQLite3) uses a single file. Prior versions of the format required a spatial index file (SIF), with an optional key index file (KIF) to speed access to the file.

The SDF file format can be created and manipulated using an OSGeo FDO Provider for SDF, which is open-source software. Beyond Autodesk's products, products that can read/write the format include FME from Safe Software, Fdo2Fdo, and the FdoToolbox.

The SDF format design uses low-level storage components of SQLite using a flat binary serialization (binary large objects). However, the relational aspects are not present, thus the format cannot be opened with any software designed specifically for SQLite. The format supports multiple feature classes per file and multiple geometry properties per feature class. Each geometry property is indexed using an R-tree. It is optimized for fast spatial reading of large datasets in scenarios involving a single writer and multiple readers.
