= Feature data =

In geographic information systems, a feature is an object that can have a geographic location and other properties. Common types of geometries include points, arcs, and polygons. Carriageways and cadastres are examples of feature data. Features can be labeled when displayed on a map.

== Feature types ==
The definition of features that share membership of a common theme is a feature type, though there are a number of terms for this characteristic, including category, feature class, group, layer, level, object, and theme.

Layer served as the traditional term of choice, but the use of this word has declined, as data has become more object-oriented and less concerned with cartographic layering.

Data modelers can use feature types to create a hierarchical structure. For example, a dataset may consist of types called highways, streets and lanes. The system may group these particular types together under a category called "Roads".

== See also ==
- Feature class
