= UDig =

uDig
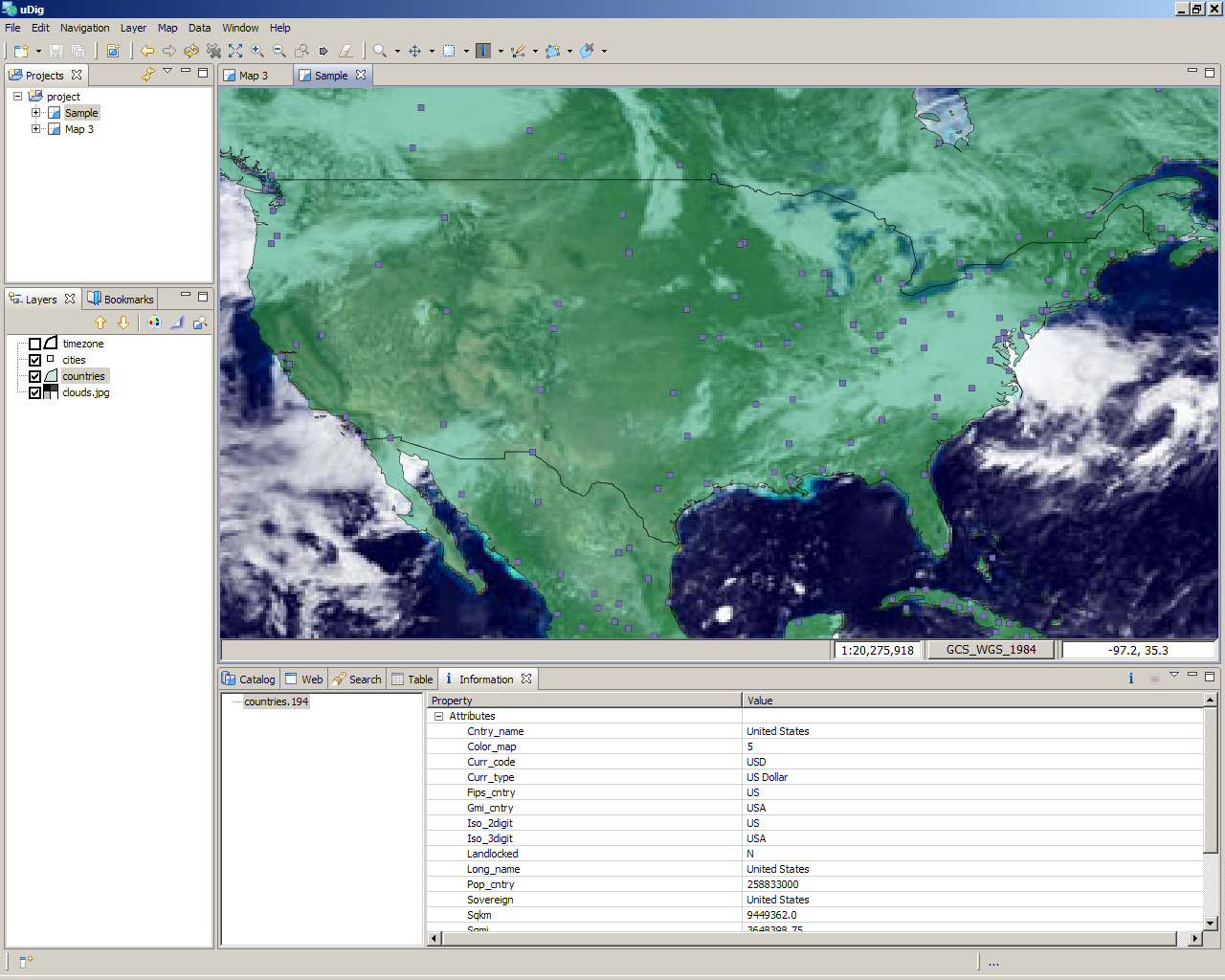
- uDig-1.1-RC14
- Developer: Refractions Research
- Stable release: 2.0.0 / 25 April 2018; 8 years ago
- Preview release: 2.2.0.RC1 / 23 June 2020; 5 years ago
- Written in: Java
- Operating system: Windows, Mac OS X, Linux
- Type: Geographic information system
- License: EPL + BSD
- Website: http://udig.refractions.net/
- Repository: github.com/locationtech/udig-platform

uDig is a GIS software program produced by a community led by Canadian-based consulting company Refractions Research.

uDig is based on the Eclipse platform and features full layered Open Source GIS. It is written in Java and released under EPL and BSD licences (formerly under GNU LGPL).

The Software has a walk through in Flash and also quick start directions for those who wish to complete a full version build to write plug-ins or contribute to the main build.

uDig can use GRASS for complex vector operations and also embeds JGRASS and specialized hydrology tools from the Horton Machine. It supports shapefiles, PostGIS, WMS, and many other data sources natively.

uDig is commonly used as a framework for building other GIS platforms and applications. Such applications include DIVA-GIS and DEWS – Distant Early Warning System for tsunamis.
