= National Imagery Transmission Format =

The National Imagery Transmission Format Standard (NITFS) is a U.S. Department of Defense (DoD) and Federal Intelligence Community (IC) suite of standards for the exchange, storage, and transmission of digital-imagery products and image-related products.

DoD policy is that other image formats can be used internally within a single system; however, NITFS is the default format for interchange between systems. NITFS provides a package containing information about the image, the image itself, and optional overlay graphics. (i.e. a "package" containing an image(s), subimages, symbols, labels, and text as well as other information related to the image(s)) NITFS supports the dissemination of secondary digital imagery from overhead collection platforms.

Guidance on applying the suite of standards composing NITFS can be found in MIL-HDBK-1300A, National Imagery Transmission Format Standard (NITFS), 12 October 1994. The NITFS allows for Support Data Extensions (SDEs), which are a collection of data fields that provide space within the NITFS file structure for adding functionality. Documented and controlled separately from the NITFS suite of standards, SDEs extend NITF functionality with minimal impact on the underlying standard document. SDEs may be incorporated into an NITF file while maintaining backward compatibility because the identifier and byte count mechanisms allow applications developed prior to the addition of newly defined data to skip over extension fields they are not designed to interpret. These SDEs are described in the Compendium of Controlled Extensions (CE). This standard is mandated in the DoD for imagery product dissemination.

NITF has been implemented and fielded since the early 1990s. Its content evolved over the years to embrace new technology in support of emerging operational requirements. NITF has adopted the ISO/IEC 15444-1 standard for imagery compression, JPEG 2000. Commercial implementations of the standard are largely driven by marketability to the DoD and IC.

The current standard that defines NITF 2.1 is the Joint BIIF Profile (JBP), version 2024.1 (JBP-2024.1), dated 13 June 2023, which superseded MIL-STD-2500C CN2 in June 2024. The JBP is a profile of ISO/IEC 12087-5, Basic Image Interchange Format, in lieu of the previous military standards.

The following documents define the standard:

- JBP-2024.1 — ISO/IEC Joint BIIF Profile (JBP) 2024.1, 13 June 2023, Superseding MIL-STD-2500C/CN2
- STDI-0002 — STDI-0002 NITF Extensions 2.1 — The Compendium of Controlled Support Data Extensions (SDE) for the National Imagery Transmission Format (NITF) Version 2024.1
- MIL-STD-188-199(1)— Vector Quantization Decompression for the National Imagery Transmission Format Standard, 27 June 1994 with Notice 1, 27 June 1996.

Do not confuse this with the British National Transfer Format.
