= Mapnik =

Web mapping toolkit

- Original author: Artem Pavlenko
- Developer: The Mapnik Contributors
- Stable release: 4.1.4 / 6 November 2025; 54 days ago
- Repository: github.com/mapnik/mapnik
- Written in: C++
- Operating system: Cross-platform
- License: LGPL
- Website: mapnik.org

Mapnik is an open-source mapping toolkit for desktop and server based map rendering, written in C++. Artem Pavlenko, the original developer of Mapnik, set out with the explicit goal of creating beautiful maps by employing the sub-pixel anti-aliasing of the Anti-Grain Geometry (AGG) library. Mapnik now also has a Cairo rendering backend. For handling common software tasks such as memory management, file system access, regular expressions, and XML parsing, Mapnik utilizes the Boost C++ libraries. An XML file can be used to define a collection of mapping objects that determine the appearance of a map, or objects can be constructed programmatically in C++, Python, and Node.js.

== Data format ==
A number of data formats are supported in Mapnik using a plugin framework. Current plugins exist that utilize OGR and GDAL to read a range of vector and raster datasets. Mapnik also has custom Shapefile, PostGIS and GeoTIFF readers. There is also an osm2pgsql utility, that converts OpenStreetMap data into a format that can be loaded into PostgreSQL. Mapnik can then be used to render the OSM data into maps with the appearance the user wants.

== Platforms ==
Mapnik is a cross platform toolkit that runs on Windows, Mac, Unix-like systems like Linux and Solaris (since release 0.4).

== Usage ==
One of its many users is the OpenStreetMap project (OSM), which uses it in combination with an Apache Web Server module (mod_tile) and openstreetmap-carto style to render tiles that make up the OSM default layer. Mapnik is also used by CloudMade, MapQuest, and MapBox.

== License ==
Mapnik is free software and is released under LGPL (GNU Lesser General Public Licence).
