= MapGuide Open Source =

Web-based map-making platform

- Developers: Autodesk, community-developed
- Release: November 2005
- Stable release: 3.1.2 / March 27, 2019; 7 years ago
- Written in: C#, JavaScript, HTML, CSS
- Operating system: Microsoft Windows; some support for Linux
- Platform: 32-bit, 64-bit
- Type: Web mapping
- License: GNU LGPL
- Website: trac.osgeo.org/mapguide

MapGuide Open Source is a web-based map-making platform that enables users to quickly develop and deploy web mapping applications and geospatial web services. The application was introduced as open-source by Autodesk in November 2005, and the code was contributed to the Open Source Geospatial Foundation in March 2006 under the GNU LGPL.

MapGuide features an interactive viewer that includes support for feature selection, property inspection, map tips, and operations such as buffer, select within, and measure. MapGuide includes an XML database for storing and managing content, and supports most common geospatial file formats, databases, and standards. The MapGuide platform can be deployed on Linux or Microsoft Windows, supports Apache and IIS web servers, and offers extensive PHP, .NET, Java, and JavaScript APIs for application development.

== History ==
MapGuide was first introduced as Argus MapGuide in 1995 by Argus Technologies in Calgary, Alberta. In the fall of 1996, Autodesk acquired Argus Technologies and within a few months the first release under the Autodesk brand was introduced, Autodesk MapGuide 2.0. The software progressed through a number of releases leading up to the current Autodesk MapGuide 6.5. To this day MapGuide 6.5 and previous releases are known for ease of deployment, rapid application development, data connectivity, scalability, and overall performance.

Despite its success, the MapGuide 6.5 architecture has some inherent limitations. Most MapGuide applications rely upon a client Plug-in, ActiveX Control, or Java applet with much of the application logic written in JavaScript using the APIs offered by the client-side plug-in. All spatial analysis is performed client-side on rendered graphics rather than on the underlying spatial data. The server platform is Windows-centric.

In spring 2004 a team of developers at Autodesk began work on what is now MapGuide Open Source. Their goals were to retain all of the best aspects of MapGuide 6.5 while also meeting the goals set out above. The project was then submitted to the Open Source Geospatial Foundation in March 2006 under the LGPL license.

== See also ==
- Spatial Data File, the native file format for MapGuide
