= Web Coverage Service =

Technical standard for retrieval of GIS data

The Open Geospatial Consortium (OGC) Web Coverage Service (WCS) Interface Standard defines a web-based interface for the retrieval of coverages—that is, digital geospatial information representing space/time-varying phenomena. By providing direct access to underlying geospatial data rather than just static map images, WCS enables more advanced analysis, modeling, and processing of GIS data.

== Overview ==
A Web Coverage Service (WCS) provides access to coverage data in forms that are useful for client-side rendering, as input into scientific models, and for other analytical clients. It may be compared to the OGC Web Feature Service (WFS) and the Web Map Service (WMS). As with WMS and WFS service instances, a WCS allows clients to choose portions of a server's information holdings based on spatial constraints and other query criteria.

Unlike the OGC Web Map Service (WMS), which portrays spatial data as static, server-rendered images (maps), the Web Coverage Service delivers underlying data values along with their detailed descriptions. This enables a rich syntax for queries against the data and returns information with its original semantics, rather than just pictures, allowing for interpretation, extrapolation, and complex client-side analysis.

Unlike the OGC Web Feature Service (WFS), which returns discrete geospatial features, a WCS returns coverages—representations of space/time-varying phenomena mapping a spatio-temporal domain to a (possibly multidimensional) range of properties. As such, WCS focuses on coverages as a specialized class of features and defines streamlined functionality for their retrieval.

Subsequent versions of WCS, notably the WCS 2.0 series, adopted a modular specification approach, refining requirements and clarifying ambiguities to improve interoperability. Core operations such as GetCapabilities, DescribeCoverage, and GetCoverage enable clients to request and obtain coverage data in various formats and coordinate reference systems, facilitating more sophisticated data processing and analysis scenarios than simple map portrayal.

WCS uses the coverage model of the OGC GML Application Schema for Coverages, thereby supporting all coverage types defined by that schema. As a result, WCS is not limited to quadrilateral grid coverages, extending beyond what earlier versions of the service supported.

== WCS Core, Extensions, and Application Profiles ==
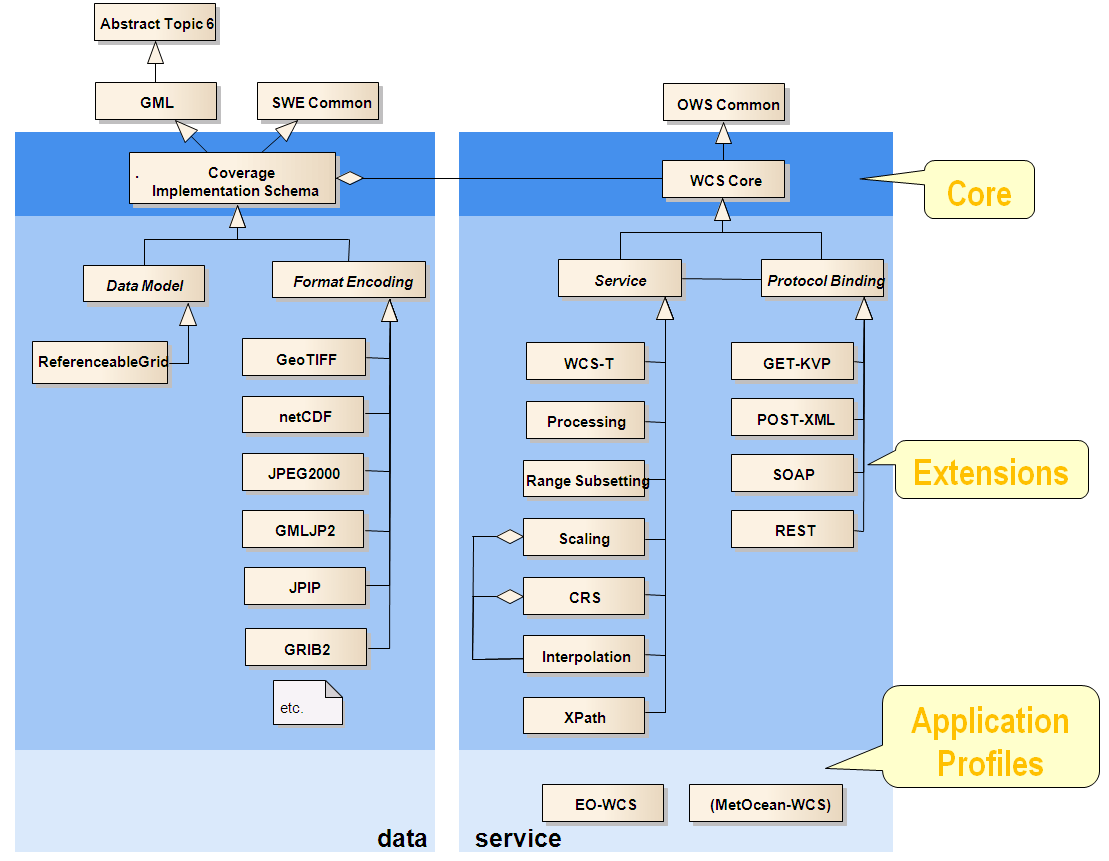
WCS Suite: Logical View

The WCS suite is organized as a Core, which every WCS implementation must support, and a set of extensions defining additional functionality. Implementers can choose which extension to support, but there are some basic rules to be obeyed - for example, every WCS implementation must support at least one communication protocol and at least one data encoding format. To ease overview, extensions have been grouped along five categories: data model, encodings, service model, protocols, and usability. Application Profiles, finally, establish domain-oriented "bundles" of the WCS Suite. Some of these specifications are briefly presented below.

Adopted WCS standards are available from the OGC WCS page.

=== WCS Core ===
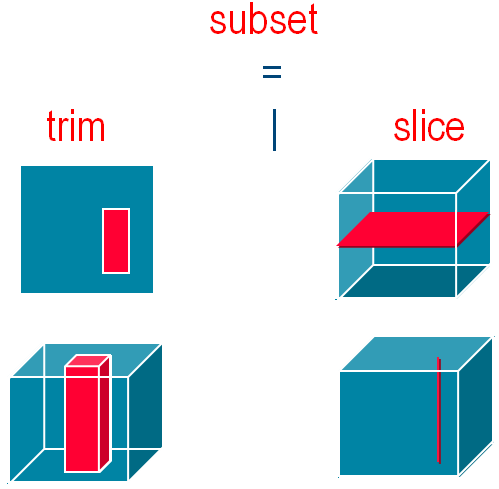
WCS trim and slice

The WCS Core establishes basic spatial and temporal extraction. There are two types of subsetting, which can be combined: Trimming extracts a sub-area of a coverage indicated by a bounding box; the result has the same dimension (i.e., number of axes) as the original coverage. Slicing performs a cut at the position indicated, thereby reducing the dimension of the result coverage.

Technically, WCS Core establishes three request types, inline with the OGC Web Service definition:

- GetCapabilities: delivers an XML-encoded description of service properties and the data holdings offered by the server inquired;
- DescribeCoverage: delivers XML-encoded descriptions of coverages (such as their location in space and time);
- GetCoverage: delivers a coverage (or part thereof), either as original data or processed, in some suitable data format.

=== WCS Protocol Extensions ===
WCS requests and responses can make use of one of the following protocols:

- GET/KVP: using the HTTP GET protocol for sending key-value pair (KVP) encoded requests and receiving XML metadata and binary coverage data.
- POST/XML: using the HTTP POST protocol for transferring XML data and binary coverage data.
- SOAP/XML: using the SOAP protocol for transferring XML data and binary coverage data.

=== WCS Format Extensions ===
WCS format encodings allow to deliver coverages in various data formats, such as GML, GeoTIFF, HDF-EOS, CF-netCDF or NITF.

=== WCS Range Subsetting ===
Range subsetting (not to be mixed up with the (domain) subsetting of the WCS Core) allows extracting components from structured cells ("pixels", "voxels") of a coverage. Cells are structured if they contain several components, such as the three components red, green, and blue in color images.

For example, from a 7-band Landsat satellite image a range subsetting request may extract the near-infrared, red, and green range components ("bands", "channels"). The geospatial extent is unchanged, that is: "pixels" from all the coverage's locations get delivered.

=== WCS-T Extension ===
WCS-T (T standing for transactional) establishes how to upload complete coverages to a server or modify existing coverages on a server.

=== WCS Processing Extension ===
Web Coverage Processing Service (WCPS) defines flexible ad-hoc processing and filtering on coverage sets. This is an abstract query language (like SQL and XQuery) that is independent from any other OGC service standard. The WCS Processing Extension establishes linkage of WCPS into the WCS suite, introducing an additional request type, ProcessCoverages, which accepts a WCPS query string and returns a list of response items resulting from server-side WCPS evaluation.

=== WCS CRS Extension ===
The forthcoming WCS Coordinate System Extension allows retrieving coverages in Coordinate Reference Systems (CRSs) different from the Native CRS in which the coverage is stored on the server - in other words, it allows reprojection.

== Software support for WCS ==
=== OGC Compliance Testing ===
OGC provides the free, open-source Compliance and Interoperability Test Engine (CITE) to determine compliance of a particular implementation with a given OGC specification. A list of all specification tests made available by OGC can be found on the OGC compliance page.

=== WCS Implementations ===
Implementations where OGC officially acknowledges compliance can be found on the authoritative OGC page. See also the discussion "compliant vs implementing".

=== Compliant Products (WCS 2.0 Interface Standard – Core: Corrigendum 2.0.1) ===
These products have successfully passed OGC compliance testing for the WCS 2.0 Interface Standard – Core: Corrigendum 2.0.1.

- EGIS CO., LTD.
  - DIGITAL TWIN CLOUD 1.0 (Registered: 2022-10-18; Certified: 2023-10-06)
- Esri
  - ArcGIS Enterprise 11.2 (Registered: 2024-01-29; Certified: 2024-02-06)
  - ArcGIS Enterprise 11.1 (Registered: 2023-06-12; Certified: 2023-06-26)
  - ArcGIS Enterprise 11.0 (Registered: 2022-07-26; Certified: 2022-08-08)
  - ArcGIS Enterprise 10.9 (Registered: 2021-06-30; Certified: 2021-07-28)
  - ArcGIS Enterprise 10.8 (Registered: 2019-12-26; Certified: 2020-03-09)
  - ArcGIS Enterprise 10.7 (Registered: 2019-03-20; Certified: 2019-04-10)
  - ArcGIS Enterprise 10.6 (Registered: 2018-01-23; Certified: 2018-02-23)
  - ArcGIS Enterprise 10.5 (Registered: 2016-10-27; Certified: 2016-12-02)
  - ArcGIS 10.4 for Server (Registered: 2016-02-11; Certified: 2016-02-12)
- Hexagon
  - LuciadFusion 2024 (Registered: 2024-09-04; Certified: 2024-11-13)
  - LuciadLightspeed 2024 (Registered: 2024-09-04; Certified: 2024-11-13)
  - ERDAS APOLLO 2022 (Registered: 2021-11-10; Certified: 2021-12-14)
  - Geospatial SDI 2022 (Registered: 2021-11-10; Certified: 2021-11-10)
  - Geospatial SDI 2020 (Registered: 2019-10-17; Certified: 2021-03-18)
  - ERDAS APOLLO Advantage 2020 (Registered: 2019-10-16; Certified: 2020-06-04)
  - ERDAS APOLLO Professional 2020 (Registered: 2019-10-16; Certified: 2020-06-04)
- Oracle USA
  - Oracle Spatial 23ai (Registered: 2024-03-20; Certified: 2024-05-17)
  - Oracle Spatial 21c (Registered: 2021-03-10; Certified: 2021-05-17)
  - Oracle Spatial and Graph 19c (Registered: 2020-04-14; Certified: 2020-05-17)
- WAVUS
  - GeOnPaaS 1.0 (Registered: 2022-07-15; Certified: 2022-07-19)

=== Implementing Products (WCS 2.0 Interface Standard – Core: Corrigendum 2.0.1) ===
This page lists only uncertified products. These products have been self-registered by vendors.

- Boundless
  - Boundless Desktop 1.0 (Registered: 2016-11-20; ETS Available)
  - GeoServer 2.9.1 (Registered: 2016-08-05; ETS Available)
  - Boundless Exchange 1.0 (Registered: 2016-01-25; ETS Available)
- CmWorld
  - CmWorld Server 3.0 (Registered: 2018-10-02; ETS Available)
- egis
  - DIGITAL TWIN CLOUD 1.0 (Registered: 2022-10-18; ETS Available)
- EOX IT Services GmbH
  - EOxServer 0.4 (Registered: 2014-09-03; ETS Available)
  - EOxServer 0.3 (Registered: 2013-05-14; ETS Available)
- Esri
  - ArcGIS PRO 3.2 (Registered: 2024-02-05; ETS Available)
  - ArcGIS PRO 3.1 (Registered: 2023-06-12; ETS Available)
  - ArcGIS PRO 2.9 (Registered: 2023-03-08; ETS Available)
  - ArcGIS PRO 2.8 (Registered: 2021-06-30; ETS Available)
  - ArcMap 10.7 (Registered: 2019-03-20; ETS Available)
  - ArcGIS Enterprise 10.6 (Registered: 2018-01-23; ETS Available)
  - ArcGIS for Desktop 10.4 (Registered: 2016-04-11; ETS Available)
- GeoCat bv
  - GeoCat Live 2023.0 (Registered: 2023-03-03; ETS Available)
  - GeoServer Enterprise 2023.0 (Registered: 2023-03-03; ETS Available)
- Geomatys
  - Constellation SDI 1.2 (Registered: 2009-07-17; ETS Available)
- GeoSolutions
  - GeoServer 2.18 (Registered: 2021-02-01; ETS Available)
- Hexagon
  - Geospatial SDI 2023 (Registered: 2023-10-02; ETS Available)
- IBL Software Engineering
  - Open Weather 6 (Registered: 2021-05-27; ETS Available)
  - Moving Weather 1.6 (Registered: 2014-12-09; ETS Available)
  - Visual Weather 3.6 (Registered: 2013-12-03; ETS Available)
- Nascent Info Technologies Pvt. Ltd.
  - CityLayers 2.0 (Registered: 2019-12-20; ETS Available)
- Open Source Geospatial Foundation
  - MapServer 7.0 (Registered: 2014-09-30; ETS Available)
  - MapServer 6.4 (Registered: 2013-09-17; ETS Available)
  - MapServer 6.0 (Registered: 2011-05-12; ETS Available)
- rasdaman
  - rasdaman 8+ (Registered: 2002-06-05; ETS Available)
- RSI SOFTECH INDIA PVT LTD
  - OPS GIS 2.1.0 (Registered: 2009-06-05; ETS Available)
- Scanpoint Geomatics Ltd.
  - IGiS Enterprise Suite 11.0 (Registered: 2021-10-06; ETS Available)
  - IGiS Enterprise Suite 5.0 (Registered: 2016-04-08; ETS Available)
- SuperMap Software Co., Ltd.
  - SuperMap iServer 9D (Registered: 2017-05-19; ETS Available)
- Terra Pixel, LLC
  - Streamap Engine 2 (Registered: 2010-11-01; ETS Available)

== See also ==
- Open Geospatial Consortium
- coverages
- Web Coverage Processing Service (WCPS)
- Web Map Service (WMS)
- Web Feature Service (WFS)
