= Open Geospatial Consortium =

Standards organization

- Open Geospatial Consortium logo
- Abbreviation: OGC
- Formation: 1994; 32 years ago
- Type: Standards organization
- Coordinates: 38.890646°N 77.087227°W
- Services: Standards, Innovation, Advisory
- Members: 470+ member organizations
- Chief Executive Officer: Peter Rabley
- Chief Operating Officer: Christy Monaco
- Chief Standards Officer: Scott Simmons
- Chief Technology Officer: Ingo Simonis
- Board of directors: Ed Parsons (Chair), Zaffar Mohamed-Ghouse (Vice Chair), Deb Davis, Jeff Harris, Patty Mims, Kumar Navulur, Faraz Ravi, Prashant Shukle, Velu Sinha, Frank Suykens, Javier de la Torre, Rob van de Velde
- Subsidiaries: OGC-Europe
- Website: https://www.ogc.org
- Formerly called: Open GIS Consortium

The Open Geospatial Consortium (OGC) is an international voluntary consensus standards organization that develops and maintains international standards for geospatial content and location-based services, sensor web, Internet of Things, GIS data processing and data sharing. The OGC was incorporated as a not for profit in 1994. At that time, the official name was the OpenGIS Consortium. It is a U.S.-registered 501c(6) non-profit with offices in Belgium and the U.K. Commercial, government, nonprofit, universities, and research organizations from around the world participate in a consensus process encouraging development, maintenance, and implementation of open standards.

== History ==
A predecessor organization, OGF, the Open GRASS Foundation, started in 1992.

From 1994 to 2004 the organization used the name OpenGIS Consortium.

The OGC website gives a detailed history of the OGC.

== Standards ==
Most of the OGC Standards depend on a generalized architecture captured in a set of documents collectively called the Abstract Specification. The topic volumes in the Abstract Specification describe conceptual and logical models for representing geographic features, coverage data, sensors and other geographic phenomena. Atop the Abstract Specification members have developed and continue to develop a growing number of standards to serve specific needs for interoperable location and geospatial technology, including GIS.

Relationship between clients/servers and OGC protocols

The OGC standards baseline comprises more than 80 Standards, including:

- CSW – Catalog Service for the Web: access to catalog information;
- GML – Geography Markup Language: XML-format for geographical information;
- GeoPackage – An open, standards-based, platform-independent, portable, self-describing, compact format for transferring geospatial information;
- GeoPose - An encoding standard describing the position and orientation/rotation of a 3d object (real or digital) in relation to the real world;
- GeoSPARQL – Geographic SPARQL Protocol and RDF Query Language: representation and querying of geospatial data for the Semantic Web;
- GeoXACML – Geospatial eXtensible Access Control Markup Language;
- KML – Keyhole Markup Language: XML-based language schema for expressing geographic annotation and visualization on existing (or future) Web-based, two-dimensional maps and three-dimensional Earth browsers;
- EmissionML – Emission Event Modeling Language: a candidate standard defining the ontology and data model for emission events;
- Observations and Measurements (O&M)
- Open Location Services (OpenLS)
- OGC Web Services Context Document defines the application state of an OGC Integrated Client;
- OWS Common – OGC Web Service Common;
- SOS – Sensor Observation Service;
- SPS – Sensor Planning Service;
- SensorML – Sensor Model Language;
- SensorThings API - an open and unified framework to interconnect IoT devices, data, and applications over the Web.;
- SFS – Simple Features – SQL;
- SLD - Styled Layer Descriptor;
- WaterML – Information model for the representation of hydrological observation data;
- WCS – Web Coverage Service: provides access, subsetting, and processing on coverage objects;
- WCPS – Web Coverage Processing Service: provides a raster query language for ad-hoc processing and filtering on raster coverages;
- WFS – Web Feature Service: for retrieving or altering feature descriptions;
- WMS – Web Map Service: provides map images;
- WMTS – Web Map Tile Service: provides map image tiles;
- WPS – Web Processing Service: remote processing service;

Simple Features Access, first approved in 1999, was the first full OGC Standard. Shortly after, a series of standards based on the HTTP web services paradigm for message-based interactions in web-based systems were developed and approved. These are known as the OGC Web Service Standards. These include the Web Map Service Interface Standard and the OGC Web Feature Service Interface Standard. More recently, considerable progress has been made in defining and approving a suite of Web API Standards, such as OGC SensorThings API and the OGC API - Features Standard.

== Organization structure ==
=== Standards and Compliance program ===
In the OGC Standards Program the Technical Committee and Planning Committee work in a formal consensus process to arrive at approved (or "adopted") OGC standards. Learn about the standards that have been approved so far, and see the lists of products that implement these standards.

The OGC Compliance Program provides the resources, procedures, and policies for improving software implementations' compliance with OGC standards. The Compliance Program provides an online free testing facility, a process for certification and branding of compliant products, and community coordination. The Compliance Program also runs code sprints, which are short term events for increasing interoperability among vendors' products.

=== Collaborative Solutions and Innovation Program (COSI) ===
The Collaborative Solutions and Innovation Program (COSI) is OGC's Research and Development arm, driving interoperability through initiatives like testbeds, pilot projects and experiments. COSI unites expertise and funding to tackle urgent security, environmental and societal challenges such as flood and wildfire resilience, the land- sea interface and digital twins. Sponsored by some of the world's premier governmental agencies, COSI's collaborative approach accelerates technological development while assessing the maturity of solutions, increasing their acceptance in the market. Over the last two decades, OGC has completed more than 140 initiatives and redistributed millions of dollars to member organizations.

== Community Resources ==
The OGC and its members offer resources to help technology developers and users take advantage of the OGC's open standards. Technical documents, training materials, test suites, reference implementations and other interoperability resources developed in OGC Interoperability Initiatives are available on our resources page. In addition, the OGC and its members support publications, workshops, seminars and conferences to help technology developers, integrators and procurement managers introduce OGC capabilities into their architectures.

== Membership ==
OGC's membership includes approximately 450 organizations from government, academia, industry, and nonprofits. The OGC offers membership options for industry, government, academic, and not-for-profit organizations. Individuals may also join the OGC. In 2025, OGC launched an online member engagement platform called "Agora" which is the primary online means by which OGC members and staff connect with each other. In addition, OGC holds member meetings three times a year which serve as key convenings for advancing the Consortium's mission to develop and promote open geospatial standards. These meetings bring together representatives from government, industry, academia, and international organizations to:

- Review and approve new standards and interoperability frameworks.
- Discuss strategic partnerships and membership opportunities.
- Align on technical priorities and collaborative initiatives.
- Showcase member contributions and innovations.

== Relationships with Other Standards Organizations ==
The OGC has a close relationship with ISO/TC 211 (Geographic Information/Geomatics). Volumes from the ISO 19100 series under development by this committee progressively replace the OGC abstract specification. Further, the OGC standards Web Map Service, GML, Web Feature Service, Observations and Measurements, and Simple Features Access have become ISO standards.

The OGC works with more than 20 international standards-bodies including W3C, OASIS, WfMC, and the IETF.

== See also ==
- GeoTools – implements OGC standards as OGC releases them
- Open Source Geospatial Foundation (OSGeo)
- List of geographic information systems software
- Comparison of geographic information systems software
- OpenLayers
- Semantic Sensor Web
- Weather Information Exchange Model
- GTFS
- List of open source GIS software
