= GIS Live DVD =

Thematic live DVD for Geographic Information System

GIS Live DVD is a type of the thematic Live CD containing GIS/RS applications and related tutorials, and sample data sets. The general sense of a GIS Live DVD is to demonstrate the power of FLOSS GIS and encourage users to start on FLOSS GIS. However, a disc can be used for GIS data processing and training, too. A disc usually includes some selected Linux-based or Wine (software)-enabled Windows applications for GIS and Remote Sensing use. Using this disc the end users can execute GIS functions to get experience in free and open source software solutions or solve some simple business operations. The set-up and the operating behaviour of the applications can also be studied prior to building real FLOSS GIS-based systems. Recently a LiveDVD image is stored and booted from USB (Live USB).

== Use cases ==
There can be multiple use cases:

- Demonstration of one or more GIS applications or data
  The disc contains preconfigured applications with some GIS data and introductory tutorials. It is used at workshops or meetings to demonstrate the capabilities of one or more GIS applications or data sets or results of projects that applied FLOSS GIS. It makes possible the stand-alone operation using the pre-installed tutorial and sample data. The performance is critical especially the time behaviour. Usually a demonstration disc tends to promote a project so the user friendliness and correctness are critical too.
- Evaluation of GIS applications
  The objective is to provide a simple use and compact environment for evaluating and/or benchmarking applications or data sets. It has a similar built to a demonstration disc however it needs more flexibility in using external data and access to network. The time behaviour and the performance is less critical since is highly likely the disc is run in a virtual machine. The user-friendliness is less important since the evaluation is done by professional usually.
- Education
  Primary aim of this disc is to support of certain GIS training that is based on an established curricula. It can be university education or a special training course. The selection of the applications for the disc supports the gathering of the targeted skill. The disc includes the agenda of the course too. Networking and using peripherals such as printer and external disks is important.
- Installation
  The goal is support the installation of WEB or Desktop applications by users do not have the required skills or the configuration is complex or difficult.
- Development Kit for implementing complex customised applications
  The goal is provide a package of a tools for GIS/LIS application development that includes standard software components and business related sample models and codes to support and speed up implementation. The emphases is on the demonstration of system integration and the sample databases and software codes and instruction.
- GIS data processing
  Theoretically a Thematic Live DVD can be used for supporting real business procedures. A USB version of a Live DVD can be adopted to data collection where it includes a specific set-up, e.g. an IT system for spatial related census.

== Creation ==
The creation is usually based on an existing Live CD. Some of the GIS and Remote sensing applications are already included in the basic Linux distribution. Some other packages has got "ready to install" versions while some others need to be translated from the source code. After having got all applications and related contents (e.g. documentations, sample data) installed the image of the Live DVD is created by the basic distribution provided tools.

== Risks and assumptions ==
The CASCADOSS research project has identified the following risks of disc creation

- Shortages of the Incomplete Applications
  The developments of several FLOSS products are not completed. There are some never finished products too. However these incomplete products can have extremely useful functionality that makes use in environmental GIS data processing. By adding them to a disc their weaknesses could not be fixed. Moreover, in case of some old products the incompatibility, e.g. Linux kernel is a real risk.
- Coexistence Problems
  In order to create a disc that includes several applications various sub-packages needs to be installed. These packages are not necessarily compatible. They have different technical approach and quality. Therefore, some products cannot coexist smoothly (or at all) with the others on the same Linux distribution.
- Difficulties with Closed Package Dependent Applications
  When the code of an FLOSS product is open then errors and reasons can be identified, the code can be corrected and the binary version can be recompiled. However, there are some closed packages, e.g. Sun's Java Runtime Environment that cannot be diagnosed or modified. Therefore, some Java based and closed package dependent application cannot be installed.
- Difficulties Proprietary Hardware Drivers
  Several hardware drivers, e.g. video, wireless, printer are proprietary software. The standard Linux drivers can not necessarily manage them correctly. Therefore, it is impossible to create a disc that compatible with all PCs. Especially the notebooks could have problem in running a LiveDVD.
- Difficulties with Obsolete Hardware
  The Linux kernel is continuously evolving so some older hardware are not supported in a standard way so it is not possible to support them on a disc.
- Legal Risks (a plethora of different FLOSS licences)
  The complex dependency of packages can result conflicts of different FLOSS licences. Several package needs to be changed recompiled and some dependent packages needs to be replaced by a functionally equivalent that can have incompatible licence. Therefore, some FLOSS project could complain for removing their package from the Live CD.
- Licence or Patent violations
  Some FLOSS products depend on proprietary package some others have code that can violate patents or related rights of some firms. Since the broad national differences in related rights the violation depends on where the Live CD is run. Therefore, some right owners could complain for removing some package from the Live CD.
- Exceeding available room
  FLOSS GIS/Remote sensing/Environmental applications have a large amount of sample, demonstration and training data sets. Installing all the data could easily result too large amount of data that cannot be burnt to a CD or DVD. Therefore, some data sets might be excluded from the media.
- Poor I18n support in the GIS/Remote sensing applications
  The I18n stands for the internationalization in IT applications. Unfortunately several applications do not care the international use of applications that makes hard or impossible the use of national characters or integrating an application to a national version of an operating system.
- Unfamiliarity of Linux
  Most of the PC users are inflexible to turn to any different operating system. Therefore, a Linux-based application can be strange for them since it has a different habit than well-known products. Moreover, the terminal-based operation is unacceptable for most of the end-users.
- Quality Problems of the Basic Linux distribution Are Hardy Manageable
  As all software products, the Linux distributions have bugs and failures. These problems have a direct impact on any Live CD and cannot be handled as part of a Live CD creation that is focused on applications and not the functions of the operating system.

== Functions ==
The following diagram presents a general function–means tree of the GIS LiveDVDs:

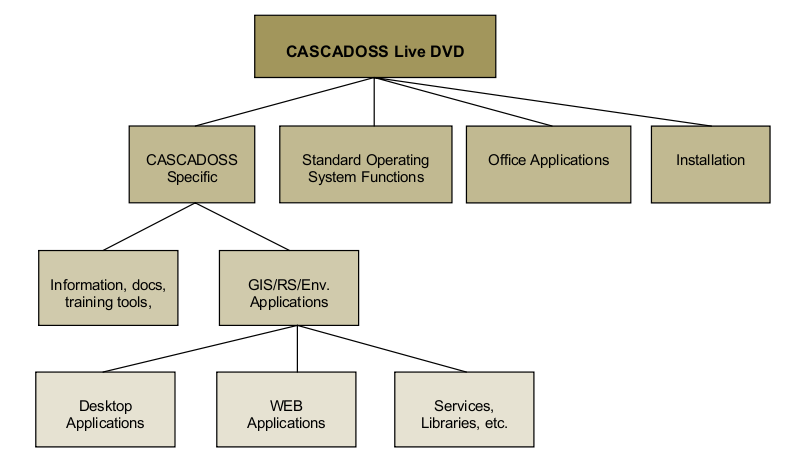
- Installation
  The ability to install comes from the basic Linux distribution usually. To keep this feature of the basic Linux distribution, the thematic content needs to be stored according to the standards of the basic distribution. As part of the installation, the system makes an update that can spoil the set-up of the added applications. In order the fully reserve this feature, repositories must be created and regularly maintained for all the installed applications.
- Standard functions of the operating system
  This is usually provided by the basic Linux distribution. Use of resources and peripherals must be adjusted to the needs of the installed application. The tools are available for experienced users to correct the set-up or customise Live CD while it is in use.
- Office applications
  This means an Office suite that makes possible to run slides, editing texts and images.
- GIS application-specific functions
  This covers information content, tutorials, user guides, etc. and the functions provided by the GIS applications. It has sense to divide applications to desk top, server and terminal based tools.

== Existing GIS Live DVDs ==
=== ArcheOS ===
Primary use is professional archaeological work. Distributor: Arc-Team Italy. Basic Operating system: Debian, 2010, Software included: AutoQ3D, OpenJUMP GIS, XvidCap, QCAD, SAGA GIS, ParaView, PostgreSQL, PostGIS, JSVR, WhiteDune, Pmapper, GRASS

=== Cascadoss LiveDVD ver 3.0 ===
Primary uses are evaluation and training. Distributor: Compet-Terra Bt. Hungary as a member of the CASCADOSS project. Basic distribution: Fedora 11. GIS software included: GRASS GIS, gvSIG, ivics, ISIS Modelling Software, JUMP GIS, Kosmo, QGIS, SAGA, Ilwis, Spatialite, GeoNetwork opensource, MapServer, GeoServer, Openlayers, R, Postgresql, postgis, Data included: sample data from Belgium, Poland, Bohemia and sample data of the applications.

=== Debian GIS Live image ===
Primary use is demonstration. Distributor: Software in the Public Interest, Inc., United States of America. Basic distribution: Debian, 2007, GIS Software Included: QGIS 0.8.0-5, earth3d 1.0.5-1, mapnik 0.4.0-1, Grass 6.2.1-3, gpsbabel 1.3.3-2, mapserver 4.10.2-1, gpsdrive 2.09-2.2, kflog 2.1.1-3.1, postgis 1.2.1-2

=== Esri Geoportal Server Live DVD ===
Primary use is evaluation and demonstration. Distributor: Esri, Inc., United States of America. Basic distribution: Debian Squeeze, GIS Software Included: Esri Geoportal Server 1.2.5

=== FOSS4G 2009 Live DVD ===
Primary uses are demonstration, education and installation. Distributor: The Open Source Geospatial Foundation, Basic distribution: Ubuntu Hardy, 2009, Software included: GDAL/OGR, mapserver, GRASS, postgis, pgadmin, GDAL-GRASS plugin, PROJ.4, geoserver, uDig, gvSIG, R-spatial, GeoNetwork opensource

=== FOSS4G 2008 "Practical Introduction to GRASS" workshop Live DVD ===
Primary use is education. FOSS4G 2008 "Practical Introduction to GRASS and related software for beginners" Workshop Live DVD. Creator: M. Ciolli, C. Tattoni, P. Zatelli, Dipartimento di Ingegneria Civile e Ambientale, Facoltà di Ingegneria, Università di Trento, Italy. Basic operating system: Kubuntu 8.04. Software: GRASS GIS 6.2.3 and GRASS GIS 6.4 (snapshot_2008_7_12), R 2.7.0 with GRASS support, QGIS 0.10 with GRASS plugin, PostgreSQL 8.3.8, PostGIS 1.3.3, pgAdminIII 1.8.2, pgagent 1.8.2, GRASS tutorial and workshop slides.

=== GISAK ===
Primary use is education. Creator: Jan Růžička, František Klímek, Institute of Geoinformatics, Faculty of Mining and Geology, Czech Republic. Basic distribution: Knoppix, 2006, GIS Software. included: GRASS, Thuban, GpsDrive, JUMP GIS, MapLab, MapServer, QGIS, PostGIS

=== GIS Knoppix ===
Primary use is demonstration. Distributor: Sourcepole AG, Switzerland. GIS Basic distribution: Knoppix Software included: GRASS 6.2, UMN MapServer 4.4.1, MapLab 2.0.1, PostgreSQL 8.1.4.2, TerraView 2.0, MapDesk, MySQL 5.0.21, JUMP GIS 1.1.2, Interlis, QGIS 0.8, Thuban 1.0.0, GSdrive, GPSMan

=== GIS-LiveCD Release for FOSS4G 2006 ===
Primary use is demonstration. Distributor: GDF Hannover bR, Germany, Basic distribution: 2006, KNOPPIX. GIS Software included: GRASS 6.2, QGIS 0.8 CVS, MySQL, PostgreSQL

=== Ominiverdi ===
Primary use is demonstration. Distributor: Omniverdi. Italy (that is a group of programmers) Basic distribution: 2008, Gentoo Software included: GRASS 6.3.0, QGIS 0.11.0, PostgreSQL 8.3.1, PostGIS 1.3.1, GDAL 1.5.0, PROJ.4 4.5.0, PgAdmin 1.6.3 Data included: QGIS Dataset Alaska, Spearfish, North Carolina GRASS dataset

=== OSGeo-Live ===
Primary use are demonstration and installation. Distributor: The live DVD project of the Open Source Geospatial Foundation, Basic distribution: 2012, Xubuntu Software included: OpenLayers, Geomajas, Mapbender, MapFish, GeoMoose, Sahana Eden, Ushahidi, PostGIS, SpatiaLite, Rasdaman, pgRouting, QGIS desktop and server, GRASS GIS, gvSIG, uDig, Kosmo, OpenJUMP GIS, SAGA GIS, OSSIM, Geopublisher, AtlasStyler, osgEarth, GpsDrive, Marble, OpenCPN, OpenStreetMap, Prune, Viking, zyGrib, GeoKettle, GDAL/OGR, GMT, Mapnik, MapTiler, OTB, R Spatial Task View, GeoServer, MapServer, deegree, GeoNetwork, MapProxy, 52°North WSS,52°North WPS, 52°North SOS, TinyOWS, ZOO Project, GeoTools, MetaCRS, libLAS. Data included: Natural Earth, OSGeo North Carolina, OpenStreetMap. Windows and Apple Installers for some of the above applications. A video of the OSGeo-Live is available too.

=== Italian GRASS DVD ===
Primary use is education. Creator: M. Ciolli, C. Tattoni, A. Vitti, P. Zatelli, Dipartimento di Ingegneria Civile e Ambientale, Facoltà di Ingegneria, Università di Trento, Italy. Basic operating system: Kubuntu 9.04 2009 GRASS, GIS 6.4RC4, PostgreSQL 8.3.7, pgAdminIII 1.8.4, QGIS 1.1.0, PostGIS 1.3.3, R 2.9.0 with gstat and spgrass6 packages, North Carolina GRASS Dataset, QGIS & GRASS Tutorials.

== See also ==
- GIS
- List of geographic information systems software
- List of live CDs
- List of remastering software
- Live USB
- Software appliance

== Screenshots ==
Here are some screenshots of live CDs dedicated to GIS:

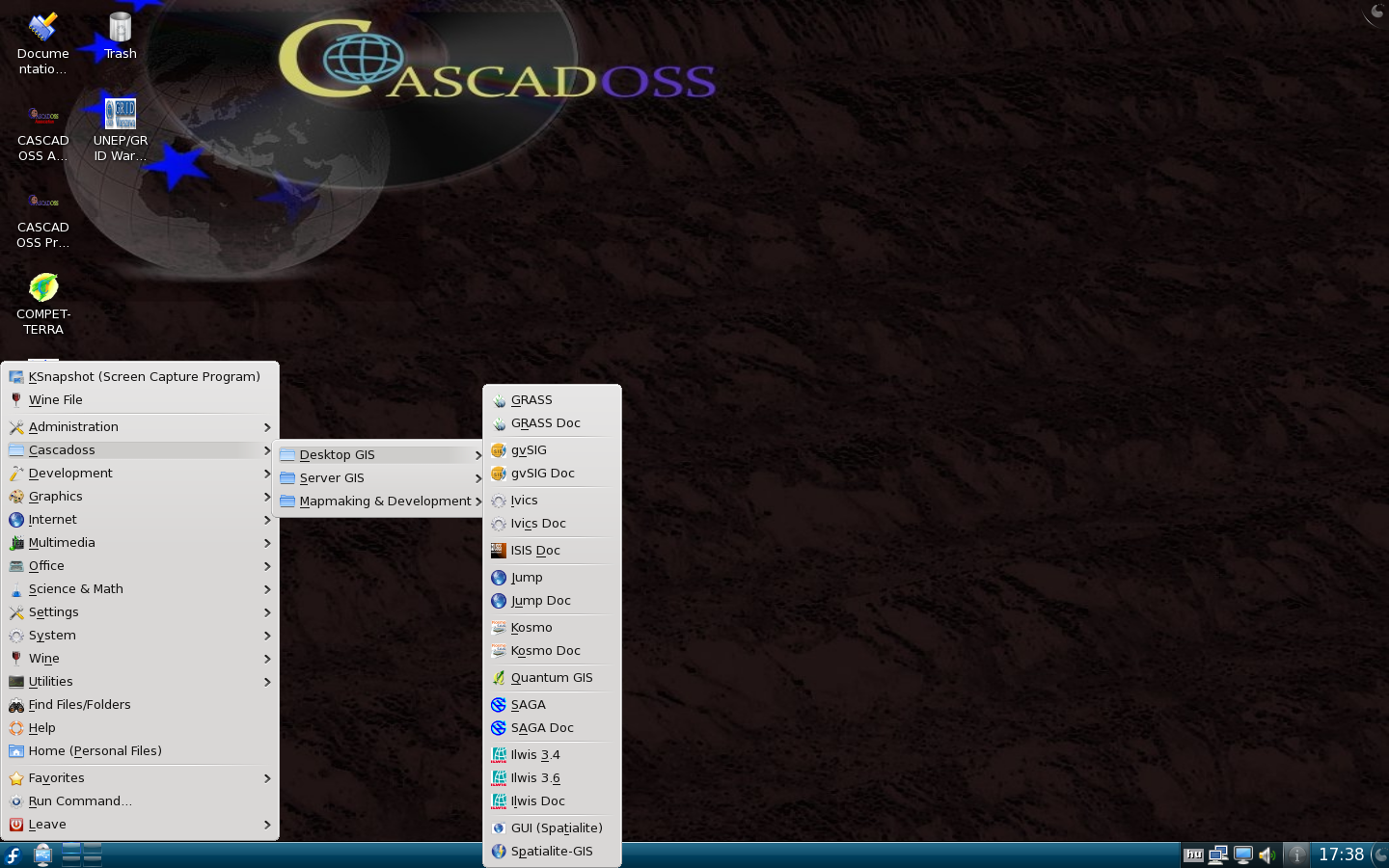
Cascadoss LiveDVD

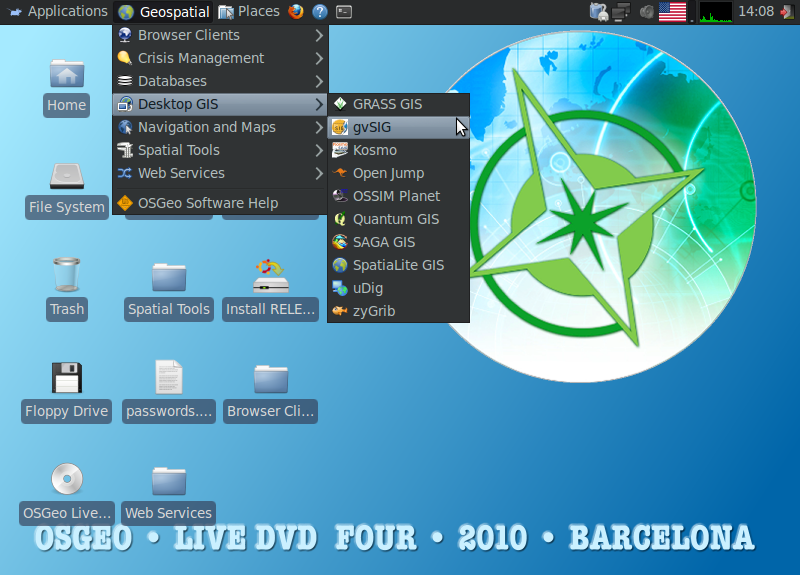
FOSS4G Live DVD

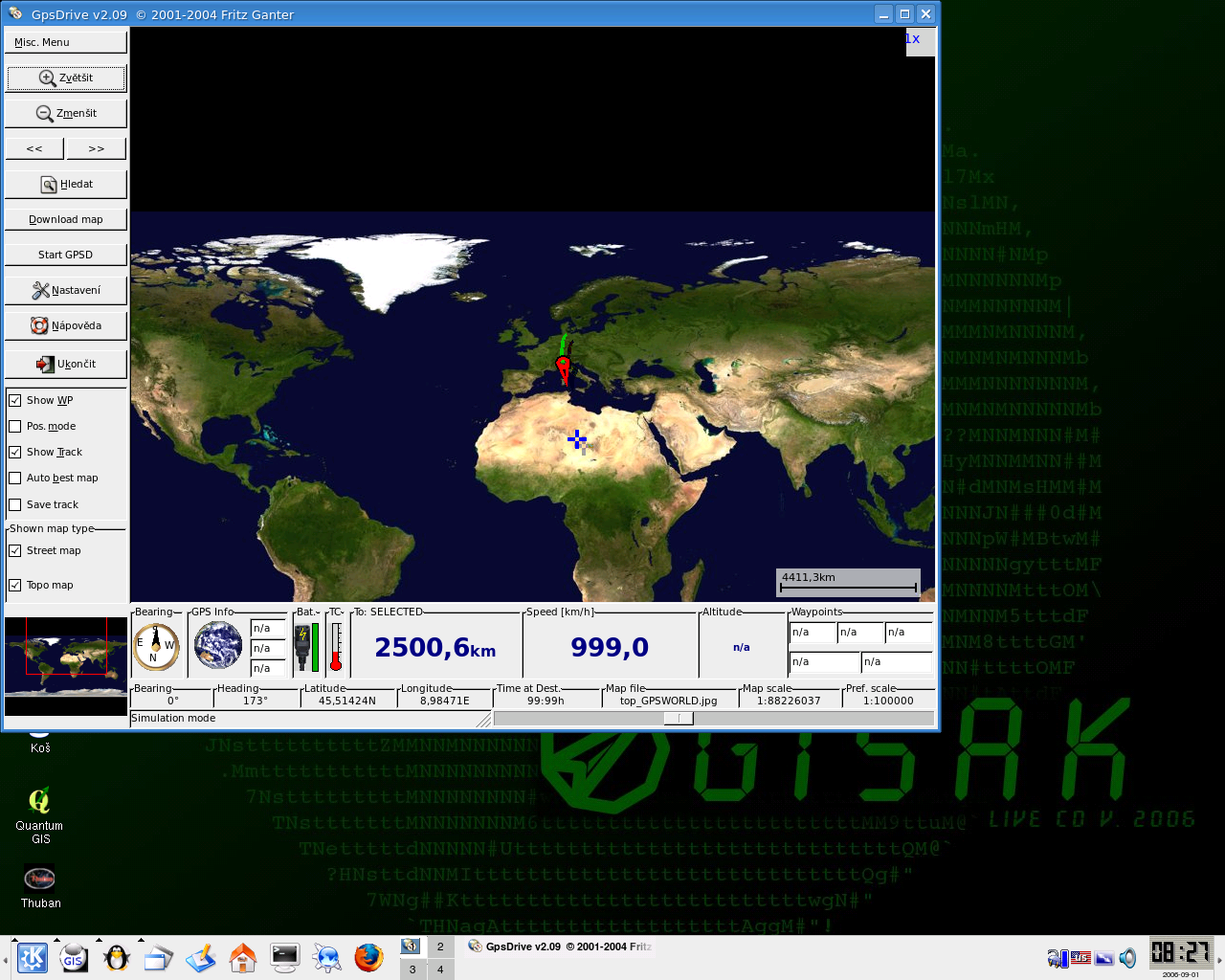
Gisak LiveCD

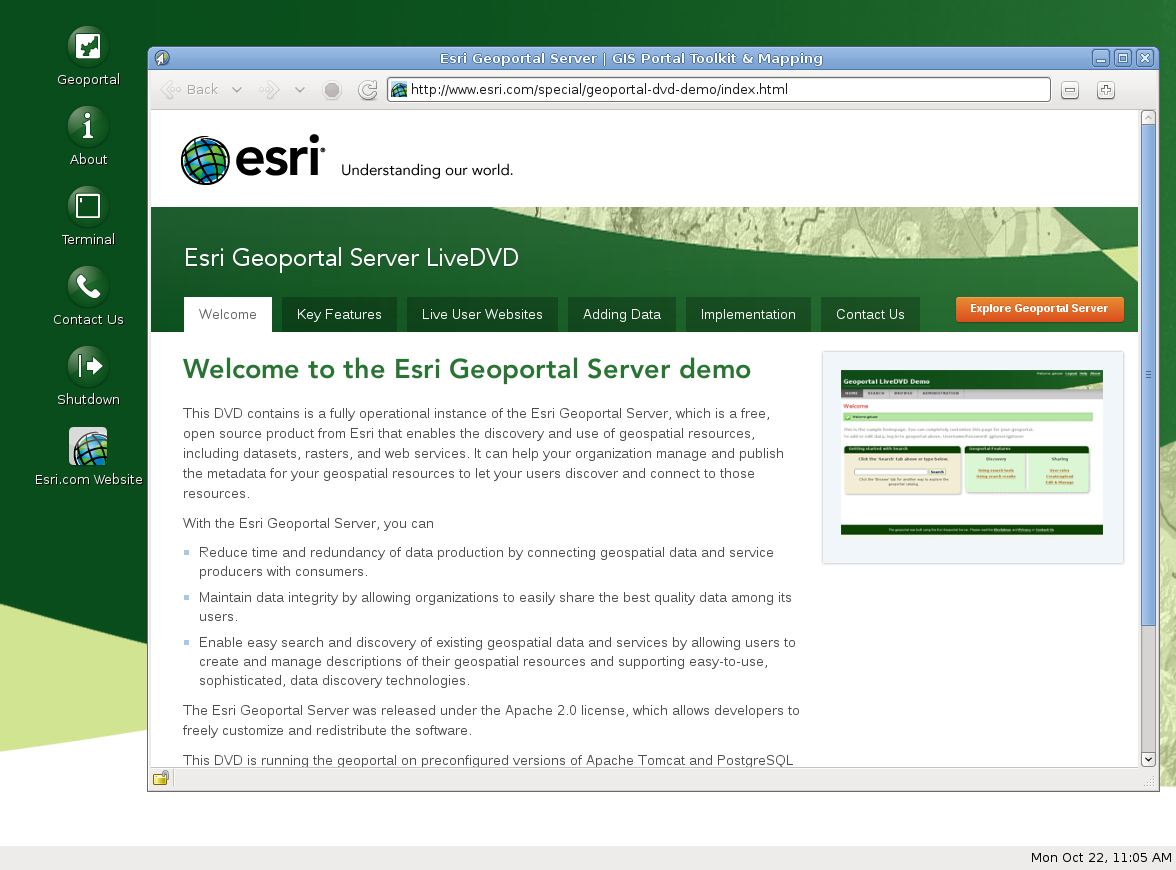
Esri Geoportal Server LiveDVD Demo
