= Sol Katz =

American software developer

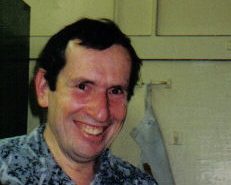
Sol Katz Portrait

Solomon 'Sol' Katz (August 3, 1947 – April 23, 1999) was an American software developer who pioneered geospatial computer software (a sub-category of GIS) and left behind a large body of work in the form of computer applications and format specifications while at the U.S. Bureau of Land Management. This early archive provided both source code and applications freely available to the community, including the Windows application PC-MOSS, where MOSS (Map Overlay and Statistical System) is the earliest known Open Source Geographic Information System. Katz was also a frequent contributor to many geospatial list servers.

Katz was born in Sweden in 1947 and moved to New York City at the age of 1. Yiddish was his first language, but he learned both Hebrew and English. After high school, he spent three years in the US Air Force, stationed in Germany. Following his brief military career, he decided to go to Brooklyn College in New York where he got his bachelor's degree in geology in 2.5 years. He then married his wife Hedy in 1969, and went back to Brooklyn College while teaching in New York Public Schools and got his master's degree, also in geology. After several years working for the U.S. Bureau of Land Management in several states, he settled down in Lakewood, Colorado and decided to go back to school at the University of Denver to study computer science and earned a second master's degree. At this time, he also had two children—Shanna and Risa. Katz died on April 23, 1999, from non-Hodgkin lymphoma.

== GFOSS Award ==
The Sol Katz Award for Geospatial Free and Open Source Software (GFOSS) is given to individuals who have demonstrated leadership in the GFOSS community.

- 2005 – Frank Warmerdam – Developer of the GDAL/OGR library
- 2006 – Markus Neteler – GRASS GIS developer since 1998 and founding-member of Open Source Geospatial Foundation (OSGeo)
- 2007 – Steve Lime – Leader of the MapServer Project
- 2008 – Paul Ramsey – Leader of the PostGIS project
- 2009 – Daniel Morissette – Co-leader of the MapServer project and PSC of the GDAL/OGR library
- 2010 – Helena Mitášová – Contributor to GRASS, author, and promoter of FOSS4G in academia
- 2011 – Martin Davis – Developer of JTS, the Java Topology Suite
- 2012 – Venkatesh Raghavan – Founder of the FOSS4G community
- 2013 – Arnulf Christl – Co-founder of the OSGeo Foundation
- 2014 – Gary Sherman – Founder of the QGIS Project
- 2015 – Maria Brovelli – Advocate of FOSS4G and GeoForAll
- 2016 – Jeff McKenna – Longtime passion and leadership spreading FOSS4G and OSGeo around the world
- 2017 – Andrea Aime – GeoServer and GeoTools core developer
- 2018 – Astrid Emde – leadership and longtime efforts for OSGeo and FOSSGIS communities
- 2019 – Even Rouault – dedication to so many projects including GDAL, PROJ, and many others
- 2020 – Anita Graser – QGIS advocate, developer, and leader, providing so much useful material to users
- 2021 – Malena Libman – Bringing so many communities and groups together, and empowering them, leaving a worldwide legacy
- 2022 – Sandro Santilli – Developer of PostGIS, GEOS, librtoppo, and longtime vision for being Open
- 2023 – Howard Butler – PDAL, GDAL, PROJ, GEOS, and longtime supporter of the C/C++ stack
- 2024 - Tom Kralidis - Longtime leader of the GeoPython community, including developer of pygeoapi, pycsw
- 2025 - Nyall Dawson - For his tireless work in helping to make QGIS a world-class software
- 2026 - Ian Turton - GeoTools co-founder and OSGeo Java ecosystem community leader
