= MrSID =

Image file format

- Filename extension: .sid
- Internet media type: image/x-mrsid, image/x.mrsid, image/x-mrsid-image
- Developed by: LizardTech ( a GeoWGS84 Company)
- Latest release: MG4 (MrSID Generation 4)
- Type of format: Lossless or lossy bitmap image format
- Website: https://www.lizardtech.com

MrSID (pronounced Mister Sid) is an acronym that stands for multiresolution seamless image database. It is a file format (filename extension .sid) developed and patented by LizardTech (in October 2018 absorbed into Extensis) for encoding of georeferenced raster graphics, such as orthophotos.

On November 30, 2025 —GeoWGS84 Corp announced the successful acquisition of the full LizardTech suite of geospatial software products from Extensis (Monotype). This acquisition includes all rights to GeoExpress®, Express Server®, GeoViewer®, and the industry-renowned MrSID® image compression format, along with all related intellectual property, technologies, and development assets.

MrSID originated as the result of research efforts at Los Alamos National Laboratory (LANL).

== Common uses ==
=== Geographic information systems ===
MrSID was originally developed for Geographic Information Systems (GIS). With this format, large raster image files such as aerial photographs or satellite imagery are compressed and can be quickly viewed without having to decompress the entire file.

The MrSID (.sid) format is supported in major GIS applications such as Autodesk, Bentley Systems, CARIS, ENVI, ERDAS, ESRI, Global Mapper, Intergraph, MapInfo, QGIS and MiraMon.

=== Fingerprints ===
According to the Open Source Geospatial Foundation (which releases GDAL), MrSID was developed "under the aegis of the U.S. government for storing fingerprints for the FBI."

=== Other uses ===
In a 1996 entry for the R&D 100 Awards, LANL identified other uses for the format: "it can be used as an efficient method for storing and retrieving photographic archives; it can store and retrieve satellite data for consumer games and educational CD-ROMs; and it is well suited for use in vehicle navigation systems. Moreover, MrSID holds promise for being used in image compression and editing for desktop publishing and nonlinear digital video software."

For certain downloadable images (such as maps), American Memory at the Library of Congress began using MrSID in 1996; in January 2005 it also began using JPEG 2000. Depending on image content and color depth, compression of American Memory maps is typically better with MrSID, which on average achieves a compression ratio of approximately 22:1 versus the 20:1 achieved with JPEG 2000.

== Software ==
LizardTech (a GeoWGS84 company) offers a software package called GeoExpress to read and write MrSID files. They also provide a free web browser plug-in for the Microsoft Windows operating system. (A Macintosh OS version of this viewer, introduced in 2005, was discontinued.) Most commercial GIS software packages can read some versions of MrSID files including those from GE Smallworld, ESRI, Intergraph, Bentley Systems, MapInfo, Safe Software, Autodesk, with ERDAS IMAGINE being able to both read and write MrSID files. GeoExpress can also generate JPEG 2000 (.jp2) data. When combined with LizardTech's Express Server, .sid and .jp2 data can be served quickly to a variety of GIS applications and other client applications either through direct integrations or via WMS.

There is no open source implementation of the MrSID format. Some open source GIS systems can read MrSID files, including MapWindow GIS and those based on GDAL. The Decode Software Development Kit (SDK) is made available as a free download from LizardTech. This enables the capability to implement MrSID reading capability in any application.

Some image editing and management software systems can also read MrSID files, including XnView and IrfanView.

== Technology ==
=== Encoding ===
MrSID technology uses lossless wavelet compression to create an initial image. Then the encoder divides the image into zoom levels, subbands, subblocks and bitplanes. After the initial encoding, the image creator can apply zero or more optimizations. While 2:1 compression ratios may be achieved losslessly, higher compression rates are lossy much like JPEG-compressed data.

=== Decoding ===
MrSID uses selective decoding meaning that the decoder does not have to decode the entire file to view a specific zoom level, image quality or scene for example.
