= GeoTIFF =

Georefence standard for TIFF file format

GeoTIFF is a public domain metadata standard which allows georeferencing information to be embedded within a TIFF file. The potential additional information includes map projection, coordinate systems, ellipsoids, datums, and everything else necessary to establish the exact spatial reference for the file. The GeoTIFF format is fully compliant with TIFF 6.0, so software incapable of reading and interpreting the specialized metadata will still be able to open a GeoTIFF format file.

An alternative to the "inlined" TIFF geospatial metadata is the *.tfw World File sidecar file format which may sit in the same folder as the regular TIFF file to provide a subset of the functionality of the standard GeoTIFF described here.

== History ==
The GeoTIFF format was originally created by Dr. Niles Ritter while he was working at the NASA Jet Propulsion Laboratory. The reference implementation code was released mostly as public domain software with some parts under a permissive X license. On September 14, 2019, the Open Geospatial Consortium (OGC) published the OGC GeoTIFF standard, which defines the Geographic Tag Image File Format (GeoTIFF) by specifying requirements and encoding rules for using the Tag Image File Format (TIFF) for the exchange of georeferenced or geocoded imagery. The OGC GeoTIFF 1.1 standard formalizes the existing community GeoTIFF specification version 1.0 and aligns it with the continuing addition of data to the EPSG Geodetic Parameter Dataset.

== Cloud Optimized GeoTIFF ==
"Cloud Optimized GeoTIFF" (COG) is a standard based on GeoTIFF, designed to make it straightforward to use GeoTIFFs hosted on HTTP webservers, so that users and software can make use of partial data within the file without having to download the entire file. It is designed to work with HTTP range requests, and specifies a particular layout of data and metadata within the GeoTIFF, such that clients can predict which range of bytes they need to download. COG is simply a specialisation of GeoTIFF, so COG files are TIFF files.

The pattern of optimizing GeoTIFFs for HTTP range requests was first demonstrated at large scale when AWS started hosting Landsat data on Amazon S3 in 2015. The pattern was developed into the COG within the Open Source Geospatial Foundation/GDAL project, starting in around 2016. The COG format can be read and written by many common geographic software tools including GDAL, QGIS, and GeoTrellis. Various providers now supply some of their data in COG format, including USGS, NASA, Google and DigitalGlobe.

== See also ==
- Digital raster graphic
- GDAL - Open source GeoTIFF reader and writer
- Tag Image File Format (TIFF)
- The *.tfw World File
