= MapInfo Corporation =

Defunct technology company

Coordinates: 42°40′58.5″N 73°42′10.5″W

MapInfo Corp
- Type: Public
- Industry: Software; Geographic Information Systems
- Founded: 1986
- Fate: Acquired by Pitney Bowes
- Headquarters: North Greenbush, New York, United States
- Key people: Mark Catini, President (2007)
- Products: MapInfo Professional; Spectrum; Envinsa; MapXtreme Java; MapXtreme 2005; Confirm
- Revenue: ▲$165.5 million USD (2006)
- Number of employees: 940 (2007)
- Website: www.mapinfo.com

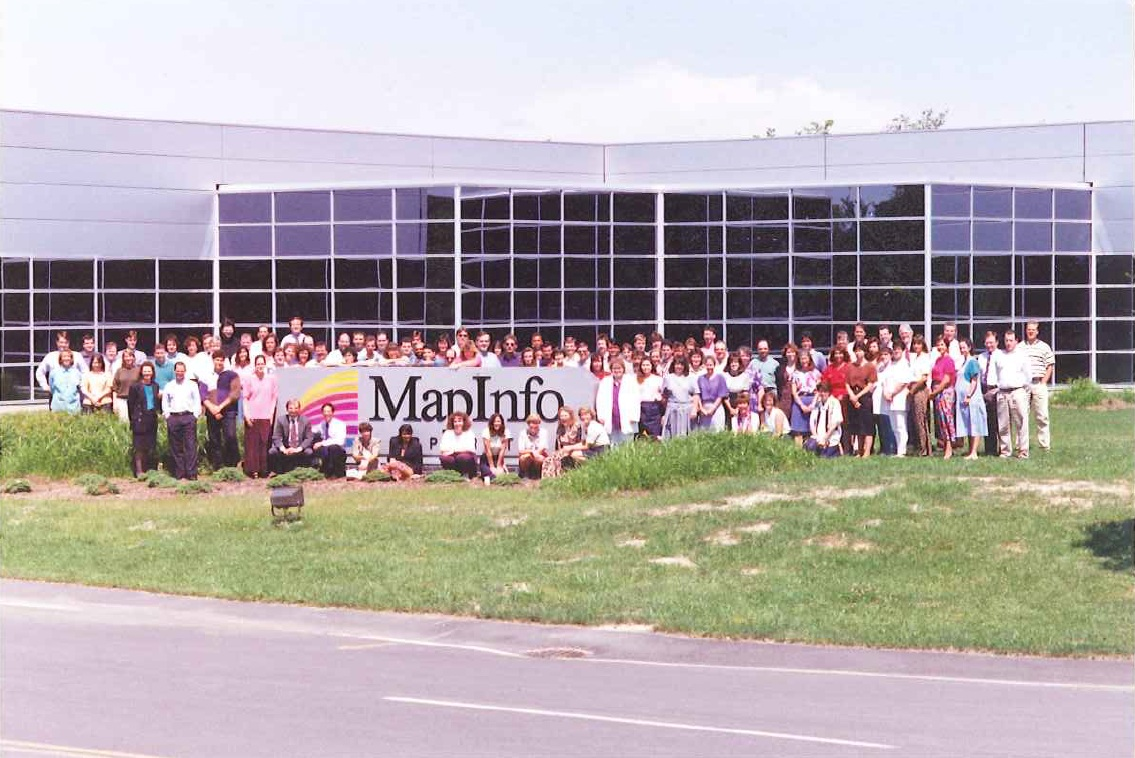
MapInfo building at One Global View in the Rensselaer Technology Park, circa 1993.

MapInfo Corporation, initially incorporated as Navigational Technologies Incorporated, was a company that developed location intelligence software. It was headquartered in North Greenbush, New York. Its products included a desktop mapping application, various map and demographic data products, and some web-based applications. It acquired several other companies in order to market their software, data, or services directly. It was acquired in 2007 by Pitney Bowes, and became Precisely in December 2019 when acquired by Syncsort.

== History ==
MapInfo was founded in 1986 by Laszlo Bardos, Andrew Dressel, John Haller, and Sean O’Sullivan. The four were students at nearby Rensselaer Polytechnic Institute who wanted to develop an inexpensive mapping tool for the PC. They got a contract to develop bus routes for a local school district, and used the money to develop their first product. They contacted Michael Marvin early in the company's history for advice on how to form the company. Marvin helped to set up the business and used his community contacts to raise seed capital. The company originated as a Rensselaer Polytechnic Institute incubator project. The first intended product was for in-car navigation, but this was abandoned when inertial navigation proved impractical.

Early competition for MapInfo software came from Strategic Mapping, which had been founded by Steve Poizner around the same time. Later, Strategic Mapping was sold to Claritas Worldwide in May 1996. Its other competitor was ESRI, which primarily sold expensive GIS software for engineering workstations.

MapInfo appeared at number 23 in Inc. Magazine's annual list of the 500 fastest-growing private companies in the U.S. in 1992. MapInfo held an initial public offering (IPO) on February 1, 1994. In the years prior to the IPO, Marvin served as chairman of the board, hiring the CEO and making sure he was comfortable with how the company was being managed. Marvin insisted that the company be run on a cash flow break-even basis, but did raise a rainy-day fund of $2 million from Greylock Partners in 1989.

MapInfo hired Brian D. Owen to be the CEO in 1991, who brought in Matthew Szulik as VP of Sales and Doug Finlay as CFO. Robertson Stephens was the lead investment bank that managed the IPO.

On April 19, 2007, Pitney Bowes entered into a merger agreement to acquire MapInfo Corporation for approximately $408 million in cash. Following the acquisition, MapInfo changed its name to Pitney Bowes MapInfo Corporation.

On December 18, 2007, Pitney Bowes also acquired Encom Technology whose products include Encom Discover and Encom Engage which are the major plugins for MapInfo Professional.

As of January 28, 2009, MapInfo and Group 1 Software were operating as one division called Pitney Bowes Business Insight.

On August 26, 2019, Pitney Bowes sold its software division (which includes MapInfo Professional) to Syncsort for $700 million in cash. The company is rebranded as Precisely in December 2019.

== Product history ==
MapInfo developed the first desktop GIS in 1986. Originally, the intention was to create an easy-to-use software package that did not require exceedingly large amounts of computing power.

MapInfo provided the first tools to Microsoft that allowed them to include mapping functionality in their products, specifically the mapping add-on branded as Microsoft Map for Microsoft Excel as part of MS Office 95. The add-on was subsequently included in Microsoft Office 97, and Microsoft Office 2000. This provided the inspiration for the Microsoft MapPoint program, which became a separate product from Microsoft, and since then Microsoft Map was dropped.

MapInfo developed a spatial datablade for Informix and collaborated with Oracle Corporation to develop the original spatial cartridge for the Oracle 8i database.

In 2000, MapInfo partnered with Lucent to "develop location-based services for mobile communications devices."

== Acquisition history ==
- 2007: Encom Technology, a supplier of specialist software, data and services to the global mineral exploration and petroleum industries.
- 2007: Graphical Data Capture, a developer of applications and offerer of consulting services primarily to local and regional UK govt authorities, in addition to utilities, financial services and insurance cos.
- 2005: MarkeTech Systems, Inc., a Raleigh, North Carolina–based provider of software, data and services for use by retail banks to enhance branch network sales and profitability.
- 2005: GeoBusiness Solutions Limited (location-based analytical and modeling services and software in the UK)
- 2004: Southbank Systems, a supplier of Asset Management systems and services to local government, civil engineering companies and utilities, primarily within the UK but also within New Zealand, Australia and the Asia pacific markets
- 2003: Thompson Associates, one of the top providers of retail site selection consulting.
- 2000: Compusearch Inc., a provider of micro-marketing segmentation and market analysis software in Canada.
- 1998: On Target Mapping, telecommunications mapping provider in Pittsburgh, Pennsylvania
- 1997: The Data Consultancy (formerly The Unit for Retail Planning Information (URPI)), a MapInfo partner with products and expertise in market analysis and data products in the UK.

== See also ==
- MapBasic
- MapInfo Professional
- MapInfo TAB format
- MapInfo Interchange MIF and MID format
