= Kosmo (GIS) =

Geographic information system

- Developer: SAIG S.L.
- Initial release: 28 February 2007
- Stable release: 2.0 / February 17, 2011
- Repository: www.opensig.es/index.php?option=com_docman&task=cat_view&gid=26&Itemid=59
- Written in: Java
- Operating system: Cross-platform
- Available in: English, Spanish, Portuguese, Russian, German, Italian, Czech
- Type: Geographic information system
- License: GNU General Public License
- Website: www.opengis.es

Kosmo is a desktop geographic information system (GIS) with advanced functions. It is the first of a series of developments that are being made available to the community.

Kosmo was implemented using the Java programming language and is being developed from the JUMP GIS platform and a series of free code libraries, all of which are well acknowledged and widely used in different free software projects (for example, Geotools and JTS). It is available for Windows and Linux operating systems.

It is a tool for visualizing and processing spatial data, characterized by its friendly user interface and access to multiple data formats, both vectorial (in a file, such as Shapefile, GML, KML, DWG and DXF, or a database, such as PostgreSQL, MySQL, or Oracle) and raster (TIFF, ECW, MrSID, or other georeferenced image files, such as BMP, GIF, JPEG, or PNG). It can also edit and offer a variety of utilities to the GIS user, like support for [www.sextantegis.com/ Sextante] libraries for raster and vector analysis

One of its main characteristics is the possibility of increasing functionality, based on extensions.

Kosmo was developed by a company called SAIG S.L. (in Spanish Sistemas Abiertos de Información Geográfica - Open Geographical Information Systems), and is distributed under the GNU General Public License.

Kosmo offers several products:

Kosmo Server: Raster and vectorial cartography server

Kosmo Desktop: desktop GIS with powerful query, edition and analysis tools

Kosmo Web Client: cartographic browser for connection with services based on OGC standards

Kosmo Mobile: GIS software for mobile devices

Other way, how to get better raster data processing possibilities (gridding, interpolation, geostatistics) is to use Kosmo together with other gis software like SAGA GIS.
