= Giggem =

Online matchmaking platform

- Website type: Social networking, Matchmaking
- Available in: English
- Owners: Giggem, Inc.
- Website: www.giggem.com
- Commercial: Yes
- Registration: Required
- Current status: Closed
- Content license: Copyrighted content

Giggem was an online matchmaking platform for musicians, bands and music industry professionals. The platform used a proprietary algorithm to analyze user profiles and provide suggestions for potential band members and industry professional connections. Turkish entrepreneur and musician Emir Turan founded Giggem in 2012.

== History ==
Turan released a beta version of Giggem in 2012 with $150,000 in seed funding. The service was officially launched in 2013. A TechCrunch article from June 2013 stated that investment by founder Emir Turan had reached $600,000.

In September 2013 the service introduced venue and promoter profiles, opening up the service to users such as "bars, nightclubs, concert halls, arenas, event organizers and promoters." Also in September 2013, Giggem won the JCI Turkey Chapter's Creative Young Entrepreneur Award. Following the award, the company's founder will attend an award ceremony in Copenhagen to compete to be the world winner.

In September 2015 Giggem announced that it was closing down.

== Services ==
Giggem's social networking service was designed to automatically match musicians with other musicians, bands and industry professionals based on the info on their profiles. It allowed allows users to create comprehensive résumé like profiles for themselves. Information was extracted from the profiles by the service's algorithm, resulting in relevant connection suggestions. The service is available to solo musicians, bands, managers, record labels, songwriters, promoters and venues as of September 2013. Giggem offers three primary features: opportunity notifications of matching users, seeking feeds and profile view analytics.

User profiles could link to relevant media content like SoundCloud files or YouTube videos and include information such as a who the musician or band is looking for, their experience level, dedication, age, and instruments. A July 2013 article in Guitar World noted that Giggem is "the industry's first comprehensive and cohesive platform dedicated to helping musicians find one another, be discovered by managers and labels, as well as promote their music, videos and career highlights."

== Auditions ==
In July 2013 Giggem launched an Audition feature for bands. The feature allows bands to evaluate potential band members based on an online audition. Bands initiate auditions by selecting a desired band position and then specifying location and genre. The auditions can be public or private (invite-only). Once started, an audition is published on the site and relevant musicians get notified about the audition for applying to participate in it. .

Giggem's georeferencing tools utilize a user's IP address to suggest connections that are geographically close to the user.
