= JUMP GIS =

Jump/OpenJUMP
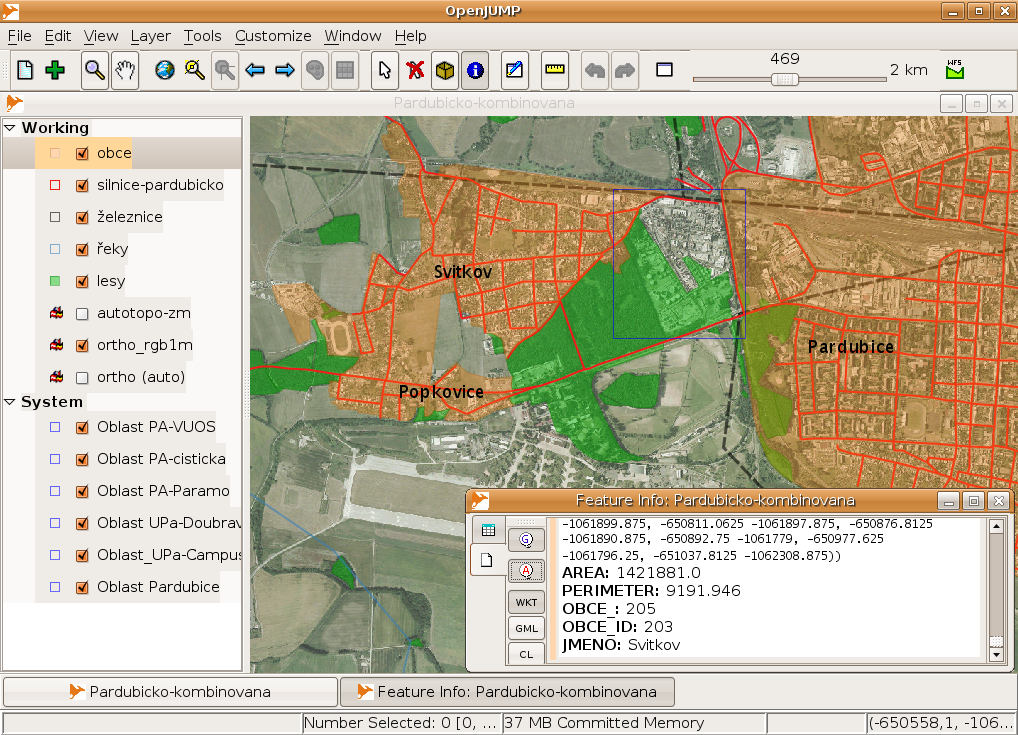
- Original author: Vividsolutions Inc.
- Developer: Jump Pilot Team
- Stable release: 2.4.0 / 15 January 2025
- Repository: github.com/openjump-gis
- Written in: Java
- Operating system: Windows, Linux, Unix, Apple macOS
- Platform: Cross-platform
- Available in: Multilingual
- Type: Desktop GIS
- License: GPL V2
- Website: www.openjump.org

Java Unified Mapping Program (JUMP) is a Java based vector and raster GIS and programming framework. Current development continues under the OpenJUMP name.

== Features ==
As featured on the project's website:

- Platform independent (Windows, Linux, Unix, Apple macOS), Java Runtime needs to be installed
- Reads and writes the file formats ESRI Shapefile, GeoJSON, GML, JML, CSV, OSM, DXF and more
- Reads database datastores PostGIS, SpatiaLite, Oracle Spatial and MariaDB, MySQL
- Writes PostGIS datastore
- Reads raster files (world file supported) e.g. GeoTIFF, TIFF, JPEG, BMP, PNG, FLT, ASC, JPEG 2000 and ECW*
- Writes raster e.g. GeoTIFF, TIFF, PNG, FLT, and ASC
- Save view to georeferenced rasters like JPEG and PNG
- Full geometry and attribute editing
- OpenGIS SFS compliant
- Geometry algorithms based on Java Topology Suite
- Many third party plugins exist (e.g. connecting to Postgis, Oracle database or ArcSDE, print, reproject vectos, etc.)
- Supports standards like WMS, WFS and SLD
- Easily extensible GIS programming environment for own GIS-applications
- Supports multiple languages:

- Czech
- German
- English
- Italian
- Spanish
- Finnish
- French
- Hungarian
- Malayalam
- Portuguese
- Portuguese (Brazil)
- Telugu
- Chinese (simplified)
- Chinese (Hong Kong SAR)

- License: GPL 2.0

== History ==
In 2002, as a project for the British Columbia Ministry of Sustainable Resource Management, Vivid Solutions Inc. created a software program to do automated matching (conflation) of roads and rivers from different digital maps into an integrated single geospatial data set. The software team made the program flexible enough to be used not just for roads and rivers, but almost any kind of spatial data: provincial boundaries, power-station locations, satellite images, and so on. The program was named JUMP (JAVA Unified Mapping Platform), and it has become a popular, free Geographic Information System (GIS).

After the initial creation and deployment of JUMP, regular development of the program by Vivid Solutions stopped. However, the company continued offering support to the user community that had grown around JUMP, and provided information to developers that had begun to improve JUMP in small ways, or who had customized it to fit their needs. Martin Davis and Jon Aquino, two former employees of Vivid Solutions that worked on the original JUMP, played a key role in the growth of this community centered on JUMP.

It soon became evident that both the users and developers would benefit from a "unified" JUMP platform. This central or core platform would eliminate the compatibility issues that plagued the JUMP user community, and would give developers a platform on which to focus and coordinate their efforts. A number of the lead members from each team working with JUMP formed the JPP Development Committee, whose purpose was to guide and oversee this new unified platform. A name was chosen for this open source GIS program to be based on JUMP, "OpenJUMP".

In particular during the second half of the 2010ths the original JUMP Platform as well as OpenJUMP GIS were used as a platform in research to develop new GIS algorithms and workflows, for instance at IGN France and the University of Zurich in automated cartography, and at Osnabrück University of Applied Sciences for then novel precision farming tools. OpenJUMP has also been in use for teaching GIS at a range of universities, leading to its inclusion at the OSGeo Live DVD Project along with many other mayor and minor free GIS software projects, despite not being an OSGeo project itself.

== File formats ==
One important feature of Jump and OpenJUMP is the ability to work with GIS data in GML format. GML or "Geography Markup Language" is an XML (text-based) format for GIS data. It is a way to describe spatial information in a human readable form, and is an accepted "open standard" for GIS data.

OpenJUMP can currently read and write GML data, and the team hopes to develop a number of utilities that will improve OpenJUMP's ability to work with GML.

The ability to work with an open format like GML is important to implementers because it gives alternatives to proprietary formats like Autodesk DWG files or ESRI Shapefiles.

OpenJUMP nevertheless also reads and writes ESRI Shapefiles and supports ESRI ASCII grid format with an OpenJump plugin from the SIGLE team. While OpenJUMP is considered primarily a vector based GIS, it also supports rasters, as TIF files or the above ESRI ASCII grid.

== See also ==
- Kosmo, JUMP based project from a Spain-based company
