= MapBasic =

Programming language

- Developer(s): Precisely (formerly Pitney Bowes Software and MapInfo Corporation)
- Stable release: v2021.1 / April 1, 2022; 2 years ago
- Operating system: Windows
- Type: GIS
- License: Proprietary
- Website: support.precisely.com/product-downloads/

MapBasic is a programming language for creation of additional tools and functionality for the MapInfo Pro geographic information system. MapBasic is based on the BASIC family of programming languages.

MapBasic also allows programmers to develop software in popular programming languages such as C, C++ and Visual Basic and use these with the MapInfo Pro GIS to create geographically based software, such as electronic mapping.
