= MapInfo Interchange Format =

- Filename extension: .mif
- Developed by: MapInfo
- Type of format: GIS

MapInfo Interchange Format is a map and database exporting/importing file format of MapInfo software product. The MIF-file filename usually ends with .mif-suffix. MIF-files usual have a related MID-file. The filename of a MID-file usually ends with .mid-suffix. If MID-file not exist, on import, MapInfo stores empty data to every data columns of created "Mapinfo Table".

MIF-file contains Block with the description of attributive Data-columns and Blocks that stores Geomentry Objects.

MID-file is CSV-like format to store the attributive Data. Each line in MID-file is related with the same order Geometry Block (Geometry Object) in MIF-file.

== See also ==
- MapInfo TAB format
