= MapInfo Pro =

Desktop geographic information system

Mapinfo Pro
- Developer(s): Precisely
- Initial release: 1986
- Stable release: 2023 / September 2023; 1 year ago
- Operating system: Windows
- Available in: 18 languages
- List of languages Multilingual: English; French; German; Italian; Spanish; Danish; Finnish; Japanese; Simplified Chinese; Swedish; Dutch; Czech; Hebrew; Korean; Polish; Brazilian Portuguese; Russian; Turkish
- Type: Geographic information system
- License: Proprietary
- Website: www.precisely.com/product/precisely-mapinfo/mapinfo-pro

MapInfo Pro is a desktop geographic information system (GIS) software developed by Precisely, used for mapping and location analysis. It was formerly developed by Pitney Bowes Software and the MapInfo Corporation.

== History ==
Version 4 of the product, released in 1995, saw the product renamed to "MapInfo Professional".

Version 9.5 was released in June 2008, bringing a new graphics engine and editing features. Version 10, released June 2009, redesigned the user interface. Version 16 of MapInfo Pro 64 bit was released in September 2016. Notable features include redesigned Ribbon interface, new interactive interface for thematic mapping, WFS 2.0 and WMTS support, Geopackage support. Python support was added in v17.0 (April 2018).

== System Features ==
=== Data Format ===
MapInfo Pro is a database which manages information as a system of Tables. Each table is either a map file (graph) or a database file (text) and is denoted the file extension .TAB.

Objects (points, lines, polygons) can be enhanced to highlight specific variations on a theme through the creation of a Thematic map. The basic data is overlaid with graphic styles (e.g. colour shades, hatch patterns) to display information on a more sophisticated level. For example, population density between urban and rural areas may show the cities in deep red (to indicate a high ratio of inhabitants per square mile), while showing remote areas in very pale red (to indicate a low concentration of inhabitants).

Retrieval of information is conducted using data filters and "Query" functions . Selecting an object in a map window or records in a browser produces a temporary table that provides a range of values specified by the end-user. More advanced "Structured Query Language" (SQL) analysis allows the user to combine a variety of operations to derive answers to complex questions. This may involve a combination of tables and resultant calculations may be such as the number of points in polygons, proportional overlaps, and statistical breakdowns. The quantity and quality of the attributes associated with objects are dependent on the structure of the original tables.

Vector analysis is a primary function of MapInfo based on X, Y coordinates and the user can create and edit data directly with commands such as: node editing, combine, split, erase, buffer, clip region. MapInfo Pro includes a range of engineering “CAD like” drawing and editing tools such as lines, circles, and polygons (referred to as "regions") which can be incorporated into tables or drawn as temporary overlays.

=== Compatibility with External Software Systems ===
MapInfo Pro can read and write other file formats for data exchange with applications such as:

- ESRI Shapefile and AutoCAD DXF
- CSV and delimited ASCII text
- Microsoft Excel and Microsoft Access
- Bitmaps or Raster Formats such as GeoTIFF, ECW, Mr. SID, JPEG, PNG, MRR
- Spatial Databases: Oracle, PostGIS, SQL Server, SQLite and GeoPackage
- Open Geospatial Consortium Web Services: Web Feature Service, Web Map Service, Catalog Service for the Web
- Web Base Maps: Bing, OpenStreetMap (OSM)

== Historical Notes ==
With MapInfo Professional, the Sydney Organising Committee for the Olympic Games (SOCOG) created hundreds of maps for the longest torch relay in the history of the modern games. The Olympic Torch Relay covered 26,940 kilometres (16,740 miles) in 100 days and traversed Australia by road, railway and boat. The torch route was designed to ensure that more than 85 percent of the Australian population was within a one-hour drive of the chosen route, which passed through 1,000 towns. In addition, TNT Express used MapInfo to map more than 5,500 delivery routes to deliver Olympic tickets to more than 400,000 Australian homes.

== See also ==
- MapBasic
- MapInfo TAB format
- List of GIS software
