= Infogix, Inc. =

Multinational analytics corporation

- Type: Private Equity
- Industry: Information Technology (Information Management Solutions)
- Founded: 1982; 44 years ago
- Founder: Madhavan K. Nayar
- Headquarters: Naperville, Illinois, U.S.
- Area served: United States
- Key people: Early Stephens (President and CEO)
- Number of employees: 455 (August 2014)
- Website: www.infogix.com

Infogix, Inc. is a multinational data controls and analytics software company for businesses to manage, analyze and monitor their data for business operations. The company is based in the United States with headquarters in Naperville, Illinois and primarily serves clients in the healthcare, financial services, property and casualty insurance, telecommunications and retail industries.

The enterprise was founded by Madhavan K. Nayar in 1982 as Unitech Systems, Inc. The company began to work on automated data controls software. In 2005, Unitech Systems was renamed Infogix after growing to represent many companies in the Fortune 100 and Global 2000 economy including Wells Fargo, Target, Progressive Insurance and Verizon Wireless.

Infogix has undergone multiple organizational changes since its inception. On June 1, 2012, Infogix announced H.I.G. Capital, a global private equity firm, had recapitalized the business. On January 10, 2014, both Infogix and H.I.G. publicly announced a completed acquisition of Agilis International, Inc., a provider of predictive customer and operational analytics.

In 2016, H.I.G. Capital sold Infogix to Thoma Bravo.

In 2018, Infogix has acquired DATUM.

== History ==
Infogix was founded in 1982 as Unitech Systems, Inc. with a focus on creating continuous, automated controls software for the mainframe to assist with large amounts of balance and reconciliation. In the early 2000s, Unitech Systems began extending its offerings and launching distributed products, and the company changed its name to Infogix, Inc. in 2005. The name Infogix was chosen based on the concept of the focal point where information, logic and exchange meet. With the new name came a new company logo. The gold checkmark in the current logo represents the company reaching to achieve the gold standard, and the equal symbol is a reference to the reconciliation technology that started the company in 1982. Infogix introduced its Business Operations Management solution in 2012 based on feedback from some of its largest customers. The company had successfully worked with IT and finance departments for 30 years, but organizations were sharing stories of successfully using Infogix products in other areas of the business, as well. Use of the software solution across the enterprise led the company to introduce its Business Operations Management solution. Infogix’ current offerings include their Controls Suite (Infogix Assure, ACR/Summary, ACR/Detail, Infogix ER); Visibility Suite (Infogix Insight, Infogix Nexix and Nexix Mobile, Infogix Perceive); and Analytics Suite (RevMind, NetMind, DataMind). On June 1, 2012, Infogix announced that H.I.G. Capital had recapitalized the business. Infogix announced its acquisition of Agilis International, a provider of advanced analytics solutions, on January 9, 2014. Founded in 2003 in Rockville, MD, Agilis currently operates as a division of Infogix.

In 2021, Infogix was acquired by Precisely Software.

== Corporate Leadership ==
Source:
