= Digital raster graphic =

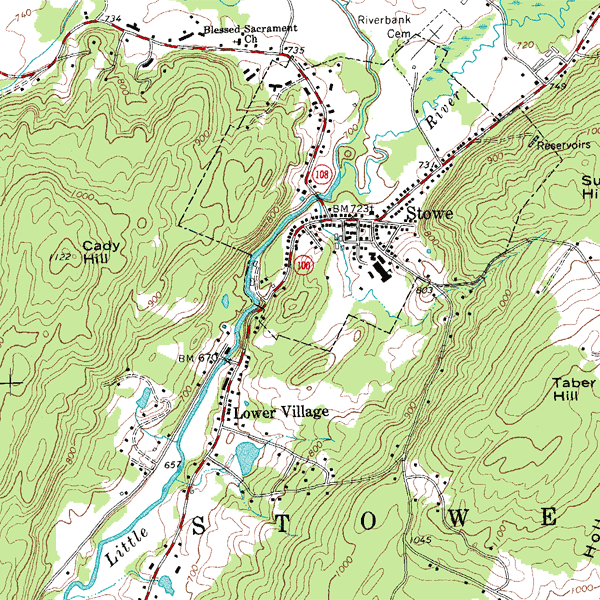
A small portion of a USGS DRG

A digital raster graphic (DRG) is a digital image resulting from scanning a paper USGS topographic map for use on a computer. DRGs created by USGS are typically scanned at 250 dpi and saved as a TIFF. The raster image usually includes the original border information, referred to as the "map collar". The map file is UTM projected and georeferenced to the surface of the Earth. DRG's are regularly used in GIS applications. DRGs were first produced in 1995.

== See also ==
- GeoTIFF
