= Markus Neteler =

German free software programmer

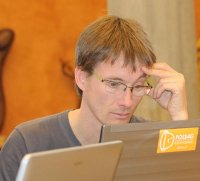
- Neteler during the QGIS Hackfest in Pisa 2010
- Born: 21 December 1969 (age 56); Thuine, Germany
- Occupation: Managing director
- Employer: mundialis GmbH & Co. KG
- Known for: GRASS
- Website: Personal home page Markus Neteler @ mundialis

Markus Neteler is a software engineer and businessman.

== Biography ==
He received his degree in physical geography and landscape ecology from Leibniz University Hannover, Germany, in 1999 where he worked as a researcher and teaching assistant for two years.

From 2001 to 2007, he was a researcher at Bruno Kessler Foundation (FBK) (formerly ITC-irst) in Trento, Italy. In the period 2005–2007, while still a FBK researcher, he worked for the Centro di Ecologia Alpina of Trento. From 2008 to 2016, he worked at the Edmund Mach Foundation (FEM) - San Michele all'Adige in Trento as the co-ordinator of the GIS and remote sensing unit. In 2016, he moved to Bonn, Germany, where he co-founded the Mundialis company.

His main interests are remote sensing for environmental risk assessment and free software GIS development, especially GRASS GIS (of which he has been the co-ordinator since 1999).

He is a founding member of the GRASS Anwender-Vereinigung e.V. (Germany), the Open Source Geospatial Foundation (OSGeo, USA) and GFOSS.it the Italian association for geospatial free and open source software. In September 2006, he was honored with the Sol Katz award for Geospatial Free and Open Source Software (GFOSS) for his commitment to the GRASS project coordination. In 2010, he received his PhD in natural sciences (Dr. rer. nat.) in physical geography.

== Publications ==
He co-authored two books on the use of the free and open source software GRASS GIS and several scientific papers on GIS.

- Garzón, M. B.; Blazek, R.; Neteler, M.; Dios, R. S. N. D.; Ollero, H. S.; Furlanello, C. (2006). "Predicting habitat suitability with machine learning models: The potential area of Pinus sylvestris L. In the Iberian Peninsula". Ecological Modelling. 197 (3–4): 383. Bibcode:2006EcMod.197..383G. doi:10.1016/j.ecolmodel.2006.03.015.
- Carpi, G.; Cagnacci, F.; Neteler, M.; Rizzoli, A. (2007). "Tick infestation on roe deer in relation to geographic and remotely sensed climatic variables in a tick-borne encephalitis endemic area". Epidemiology and Infection. 136 (10): 1416–1424. doi:10.1017/S0950268807000039. PMC 2870723. PMID 18081949.
- Rizzoli, A.; Hauffe, H. C.; Tagliapietra, V.; Neteler, M.; Rosà, R. (2009). Moen, Jon (ed.). "Forest Structure and Roe Deer Abundance Predict Tick-Borne Encephalitis Risk in Italy". PLOS ONE. 4 (2) e4336. Bibcode:2009PLoSO...4.4336R. doi:10.1371/journal.pone.0004336. PMC 2629566. PMID 19183811.
- Urbano, F.; Cagnacci, F.; Calenge, C.; Dettki, H.; Cameron, A.; Neteler, M. (2010). "Wildlife tracking data management: A new vision". Philosophical Transactions of the Royal Society B: Biological Sciences. 365 (1550): 2177–85. doi:10.1098/rstb.2010.0081. PMC 2894960. PMID 20566495.
- Neteler, M.; Roiz, D.; Rocchini, D.; Castellani, C.; Rizzoli, A. (2011). "Terra and Aqua satellites track tiger mosquito invasion: Modelling the potential distribution of Aedes albopictus in north-eastern Italy". International Journal of Health Geographics. 10 (1): 49. Bibcode:2011IJHGg..10...49N. doi:10.1186/1476-072X-10-49. PMC 3170180. PMID 21812983.
- Neteler, M.; Bowman, M. H.; Landa, M.; Metz, M. (2012). "GRASS GIS: A multi-purpose open source GIS". Environmental Modelling & Software. 31: 124–130. Bibcode:2012EnvMS..31..124N. doi:10.1016/j.envsoft.2011.11.014. S2CID 11041696.
- Rocchini, D.; Neteler, M. (2012). "Let the four freedoms paradigm apply to ecology". Trends in Ecology & Evolution. 27 (6): 310–311. Bibcode:2012TEcoE..27..310R. CiteSeerX 10.1.1.296.8255. doi:10.1016/j.tree.2012.03.009. PMID 22521137.

== See also ==
- GRASS GIS
- OSGeo
- Sol Katz
