= JTS Topology Suite =

Open-source Java software library

- Original author: Martin Davis
- Stable release: 1.20.0 / 30 August 2024; 16 months ago
- Repository: github.com/locationtech/jts
- Written in: Java
- Platform: Java SE
- Type: Library
- License: Eclipse Public License v.1.0 (starting with 1.15), GNU Lesser General Public License (up to version 1.14)
- Website: locationtech.github.io/jts/

JTS Topology Suite (Java Topology Suite) is an open-source Java software library that provides an object model for Euclidean planar linear geometry together with a set of fundamental geometric functions. JTS is primarily intended to be used as a core component of vector-based geomatics software such as geographical information systems. It can also be used as a general-purpose library providing algorithms in computational geometry.

JTS implements the geometry model and API defined in the OpenGIS Consortium Simple Features Specification for SQL. JTS defines a standards-compliant geometry system for building spatial applications; examples include viewers, spatial query processors, and tools for performing data validation, cleaning and integration.

In addition to the Java library, the foundations of JTS and selected functions are maintained in a C++ port, for use in C-style linking on all major operating systems, in the form of the GEOS software library.

Up to JTS 1.14, and the GEOS port, are published under the GNU Lesser General Public License (LGPL).

With the LocationTech adoption future releases will be under the EPL/BSD licenses.

== Scope ==
JTS provides the following functionality:

=== Geometry model ===
Geometry classes support modelling points, linestrings, polygons, and collections. Geometries are linear, in the sense that boundaries are implicitly defined by linear interpolation between vertices. Geometries are embedded in the 2-dimensional Euclidean plane. Geometry vertices may also carry a Z value.

User-defined precision models are supported for geometry coordinates. Computation is performed using algorithms which provide robust geometric computation under all precision models.

=== Geometric functions ===
- Topological validity checking
- Area and Distance functions
- Spatial Predicates based on the Egenhofer DE-9IM model
- Overlay functions (including intersection, difference, union, symmetric difference)
- Buffer computation (including different cap and join types)
- Convex hull
- Geometric simplification including the Douglas–Peucker algorithm
- Geometric densification
- Linear referencing
- Precision reduction
- Delaunay triangulation and constrained Delaunay triangulation
- Voronoi diagram generation
- Smallest enclosing rectangle
- Discrete Hausdorff distance

=== Spatial structures and algorithms ===
- Robust line segment intersection
- Efficient line arrangement intersection
- Efficient point in polygon
- Spatial index structures including quadtree and STR-tree
- Planar graph structures and algorithms

=== I/O capabilities ===
- Reading and writing of WKT, WKB and GML formats

== History ==
Funding for the initial work on JTS was obtained in the Fall 2000 from GeoConnections and the Government of British Columbia, based on a proposal put forward by Mark Sondheim and David Skea. The work was carried out by Martin Davis (software design and lead developer) and Jonathan Aquino (developer), both of Vivid Solutions at the time. Since then JTS has been maintained as an independent software project by Martin Davis.

Since late 2016/early 2017 JTS has been adopted by LocationTech.

== Projects using JTS ==
- GeoServer
- GeoTools
- OpenJUMP and forks
- uDig
- gvSIG
- Batik
- Hibernate Spatial
- Whitebox Geospatial Analysis Tools

== Platforms ==
JTS is developed under the Java JDK 1.4 platform. It is 100% pure Java. It will run on all more recent JDKs as well.

JTS has been ported to the .NET Framework as the Net Topology Suite.

A JTS subset has been ported to C++, with entry points declared as C interfaces, as the GEOS library.

== C/C++ port: GEOS ==
GEOS is the C/C++ port of a subset of JTS and selected functions. It is a foundation component in a software ecosystem of native, compiled executable binaries on Linux, Mac and Windows platforms. Due to the runtime construction of Java and the Java Virtual Machine (JVM), code libraries that are written in Java are basically not usable as libraries from a standardized cross-linking environment (often built from C). Linux, Microsoft Windows and the BSD family, including Mac OSX, use a linking structure that enables libraries from various languages to be integrated (linked) into a native runtime executable. Java, by design, does not participate in this interoperability without unusual measures (JNI).

=== Applications using GEOS ===
GEOS links and ships internally in popular applications listed below; and, by delineating and implementing standards-based geometry classes available to GDAL, which in turn is a widely supported inner-engine in GIS, GEOS becomes a core geometry implementation in even more applications:

- GDAL - OGR - raster and vector data munging
- QGIS - Desktop cross-platform, open source GIS
- PostGIS - spatial types and operations for PostgreSQL
- GeoDjango – Django's support for GIS-enabled databases
- Google Earth – A virtual globe and world imaging program
- GRASS GIS Library and Application
- MapServer - an open source development environment for building spatially enabled internet applications
- World Wind Java – NASA's open source virtual globe and world imaging technology
- Orfeo toolbox – A satellite image processing library
- R – Open source statistical software with extensions for spatial data analysis.
- SAGA GIS A cross-platform open source GIS software

== See also ==
- DE-9IM, a topological model
- Geospatial topology
