= Interlis =

Geographic information systems standard

INTERLIS is a standard for the modeling and integration of geodata into contemporary and future geographic information systems. The current version is INTERLIS version 2.3 (English), which is also listed as Swiss standard SN612031.

== Overview ==
Unified, documented geodata provides many advantages, including:

- standardized documentation
- compatible data exchange
- comprehensive integration of geodata e.g. from different data owners.
- quality proofing
- long term data storage
- contract-proof security and the availability of the software

INTERLIS helps to fulfill the above-mentioned requirements. Consequently, the discussion of interfaces about fixed formats and open program interfaces (APIs) and interfaces leads to the question which type of geodata should be captured and maintained. INTERLIS is not only targeting the mass market of the casual geodata viewers but was specially designed as an answer to the needs of the users and producers (the doers) who are relying on explicitly described geodata structures. Additional properties of this language include being specially adapted to geographic information systems implementation, as well as considerable dedication to practicability and extensibility.
