= GeoTools =

GIS toolkit

- Developers: OpenGeo, GeoSolutions, Refractions Research, LISAsoft
- Release: 1999
- Stable release: 35.2 / 16 October 2026
- Written in: Java
- Operating system: Cross-platform
- Type: GIS toolkit
- License: LGPL
- Website: https://geotools.org/
- Repository: github.com/geotools/geotools

GeoTools is a Java-based geographic information system (GIS) toolkit used to build software that works with geographic data. It provides reusable components for representing spatial data, working with geometries, filtering geographic and temporal information, and reading data encoded in a variety of formats. Its design follows specifications developed by the Open Geospatial Consortium (OGC), and additional plugins extend the formats and functions it supports.

GeoTools began in 1999 at the University of Leeds as a project by James MacGill to provide tools for creating interactive geographic visualisations. The original version was replaced in 2002 by GeoTools 2, a rewrite developed by an international group of contributors and redesigned around newer versions of Java and OGC specifications. After the original GeoTools 1 ceased to be maintained, the "2" was dropped from the project's name in 2007.

== Core features ==
GeoTools library supports the following core features:

- Interfaces for spatial concepts and data structures;
- JTS Topology Suite Geometry;
- Attribute, Spatial and Temporal filters matching the OGC Filter specification;
- Decoding technology (with bindings for manyGML, Filter, KML, SLD, and SE and other OGC standards).

The GeoTools library forms a stack for the core modules; with additional plugins available to support additional formats, extensions and integration options.

== History ==
GeoTools 1 began in 1999 at the University of Leeds by James MacGill as part of his PhD project. It aimed to provide a toolkit of resources to enable the creation of interactive geographic visualization clients. GeoTools 1 was built using the Java 1.1 environment to enable the execution of applets on a wide range of clients without the need for a plugin. It was developed in a rather ad hoc manner, with new features being added as needed. GeoTools 1 was not built with any standards in mind.

GeoTools 2 began in 2002. It was a rewrite from scratch with contributions by an international group of developers. The code base has been fundamentally redesigned to take advantage of the latest Java platform and to follow OGC specifications.

GeoTools since GeoTools 1 is no longer maintained, the "2" in "GeoTools 2" was dropped in 2007 and the project name became GeoTools. The version number followed suit in 2011 with the scheduled release of "GeoTools" version 8.

== Disambiguation ==
Geotools and GeotoolsMT are also the names of software written specifically for processing and displaying of magnetotelluric data (MT data). The original version of this software dates back to the late 1980s, and was sold by its parent company AOA Geophysics to Fugro Geoconsulting Inc. in 2011. With the sale of Fugro's geoscience division to CGG in 2013, the code and name rights now form part of CGG. An entirely new development of Geotools has been undertaken since 2012, and this new version is actively maintained and sold to customers.

== See also ==
- Open Source Geospatial Foundation
- Magnetotellurics
