= Conflation (disambiguation) =

Conflation is the merging of two or more sets of information, texts, ideas, or opinions into one, often in error.

Conflation may also refer to:

- Conflation of Readings, term used in textual criticism
- a synonym for the process of stemming in search engines
- the act of combining two distinct maps into one new map, also called Map matching
