= MapInfo TAB format =

MapInfo TAB
- Filename extension: .tab
- Developed by: Precisely
- Type of format: GIS

The MapInfo TAB format is a geospatial vector data format for geographic information systems software. It is developed and regulated by Precisely as a proprietary format.

== File components ==
The basic file components for a MapInfo Professional data set relate to the two basic environments for working in MapInfo; "Browser View" and "Mapper View".

As with most other GIS packages, several files are required to allow the user to open a data set for viewing within MapInfo Professional. The most basic view would be the browser view only. This environment provides storage of attribute or object data and is represented like a spreadsheet. In this simplified scenario, no geographic information is available.

Minimum files required for the basic MapInfo Professional browser environment:

- .TAB (The ASCII file that is the link between all other files and holds information about the type of data set file )
- .DAT (The file that stores the attribute data. This is a dBase III DBF file)

As an alternative to the *.DAT file, MapInfo Professional can use other data formats such as, *.TXT, *.XLS *.WK*, *.MDB (and for each Microsoft Access format the software also makes another small file). MapInfo Professional still creates a .TAB file that contains information about the data set file, and the user interacts with the TAB file only.

There may also be a third file:

- .IND (Optional index file for tabular data. This is present if any columns are indexed).

To view geographic information (the graphic representation of data) in MapInfo Professional, two additional files are required and added to the basic requirements for simply viewing data.

Minimum files required to view a map with the data previously discussed:

- .MAP (Stores the graphic and geographic information needed to display each vector feature on a map)
- .ID (Stores information linking graphic data to the database information. This contains a 4-byte integer index into the MAP file for each feature).

Each time a *.MAP file is saved by MapInfo Professional its objects are sorted into a storage sequence based on an R-tree spatial index. This optimises the read process of streaming data from disk to screen, at the cost of a relatively slow write process.

So the basic file set for viewing data and its graphic representation in vector form within MapInfo Professional requires a minimum of four files, normally the *.TAB, *.MAP, *.DAT and *.ID. If there is only textual information with no graphic objects, then a minimum of two files is needed: *.TAB and *.DAT.

While a data set is being edited by a user, temporary files are created by MapInfo Professional. The presence of any of these files locks the data set and prevents it from being edited by any other users. When the changes are saved, the temporary files are deleted by the software. In certain situations such as a power failure while editing is in progress, the temporary files may not be deleted and the changes will be lost. In this case the files should be manually deleted.

Normal temporary files have the following file name extensions:

- .TDA Temporary database file
- .TIN Temporary index file
- .TMA Temporary Map File

When using a database table such as Oracle Locator or Spatial, if the data is downloaded to the local machine, the temporary file name extensions are:

- .LDA Local Temporary database file
- .LIN Local Temporary index file
- .LMA Local Temporary Map File

MapInfo Professional can also use raster images and grid surfaces as layers in a map. These are stored in their native file formats, such as *.JPG, *.TIF or *.PNG, and the software again creates a *.TAB file for each one which includes georeferencing information.

A seamless table enables a single layer in a map to be derived from multiple base data sets, such as a mosaic of raster image tiles. When MapInfo Professional creates a seamless table it makes a simple vector layer which contains a rectangle for each base data set with attribute data defining the file path to the files containing the base data. When the seamless table is opened, metadata in its *.TAB file causes the map to display not the rectangles but the contents of the base tables in their place.

== See also ==
- MapInfo Interchange Format MIF and MID
