= Function–means tree =

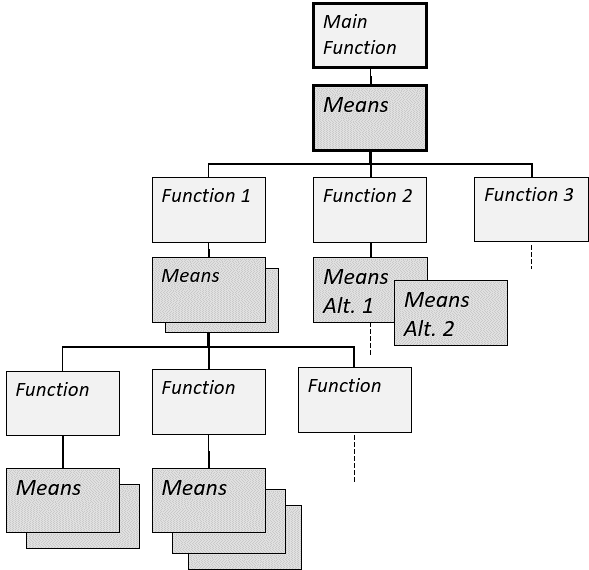
Function means tree

In engineering design, a function–means tree (a.k.a. function/means tree or F/M tree) is a method for functional decomposition and concept generation. At the top level, main functions are identified. Under each function, a means (or solution element) is attached. Alternative solution elements can also be attached. Each means is in turn decomposed into functions with means attached to each of them. A well-elaborated function means tree span, a design space where all concepts under consideration are represented.

In addition to product level requirements, there might be requirements on sub functions that may be a consequence of means at a higher level. The function means tree is a tool that can aid in the creative part of the design process. It can also be a tool for mapping requirements to parts in a design.
