= Open Source Geospatial Foundation =

Nonprofit organisation for mapping

- Abbreviation: OSGeo
- Founded: February 4, 2006; 20 years ago
- Founders: Arnulf Christl, Chris Holmes, Gary Lang, Markus Neteler, Frank Warmerdam
- Founded at: Chicago, US
- Type: NGO
- Purpose: Open source geospatial software and data
- Region served: global
- President: Angelos Tzotsos
- R.O.R. Id: https://ror.org/00cjqbk89
- Volunteers: 30000+
- Website: www.osgeo.org

The Open Source Geospatial Foundation (OSGeo), is a non-profit non-governmental organization whose mission is to support and promote the collaborative development of open geospatial technologies and data. The foundation was formed in February 2006 to provide financial, organizational and legal support to the broader Libre/Free and open-source geospatial community. It also serves as an independent legal entity to which community members can contribute code, funding and other resources.

OSGeo draws governance inspiration from several aspects of the Apache Foundation, including a membership composed of individuals drawn from foundation projects who are selected for membership status based on their active contribution to foundation projects and governance.

The foundation pursues goals beyond software development, such as promoting more open access to government produced geospatial data, FAIR data geodata, and geodata created and maintained by the OpenStreetMap project. Education and training are also addressed. Various committees within the foundation work on implementing strategies.

== Governance ==
The OSGeo Foundation is community driven and has an organizational structure consisting of elected members and nine directors, including the president. Software projects have their own governance structure, by requirement. see FAQ. The OSGeo community collaborates via a Wiki, Mailing Lists and IRC.

== Projects ==
Several OSGeo projects can communicate with each other and other geographical tools.

OSGeo projects include:

=== Geospatial Libraries ===
- FDO – API (C++, .Net) between GIS application and sources; for manipulating, defining and analyzing geospatial data.
- GDAL/OGR – Library between GIS application and sources; for reading and writing raster geospatial data formats (GDAL) and simple features vector data (OGR).
- GeoTools – Open source GIS toolkit (Java); to enable the creation of interactive geographic visualization clients.
- GEOS – A C++ port of the Java Topology Suite (JTS), a geometry model.
- MetaCRS – Projections and coordinate system technologies, including PROJ.
- Orfeo ToolBox (OTB) – Open source tools to process satellite images and extract information.
- OSSIM Extensive geospatial image processing libraries with support for satellite and aerial sensors and common image formats.
- PostGIS – Spatial extensions for the PostgreSQL database, enabling geospatial queries.

=== Desktop Applications ===
- QGIS – Desktop GIS for data viewing, editing and analysis — Windows, Mac and Linux.
- GRASS GIS – extensible GIS for image processing and analysing raster, topological vector and graphic data.
- OSSIM – Libraries and applications used to process imagery, maps, terrain, and vector data.
- Marble – Virtual globe and world atlas.
- gvSIG – Desktop GIS for data capturing, storing, handling, analysing and deploying. Includes map editing.

=== Web Mapping ===
==== Server ====
- MapServer – Fast web mapping engine for publishing spatial data and services on the web; written in C.
- Geomajas – Development software for web-based and cloud based GIS applications.
- GeoServer – Allows users to share and edit geospatial data. Written in Java using GeoTools.
- deegree – Java framework
- PyWPS – implementation of the OGC Web Processing Service standard, using Python
- pygeoapi - A Python server implementation of the OGC API suite of standards for geospatial data.

==== Client ====
- GeoMoose – JavaScript Framework for displaying distributed GIS data.
- Mapbender – Framework to display, overlay, edit and manage distributed Web Map Services using PHP and JavaScript.
- MapGuide Open Source – Platform for developing and deploying web mapping applications and geospatial web services. Windows-based, native file format.
- MapFish – Framework for building rich web-mapping applications based on the Pylons Python web framework.
- OpenLayers – AJAX library (API) for accessing geographic data layers of all kinds.

==== Specification ====
- Tile Map Service (TMS) – a specification for tiled web maps.

=== Metadata Catalog ===
- GeoNetwork opensource
- pycsw – Lightweight metadata publishing and discovery using Python.

=== Content Management Systems ===
- GeoNode

=== Outreach Projects ===
- Geo for All – Network of educators promoting Open Source geospatial around the world.
- OSGeoLive – Bootable DVD, USB thumb drive or Virtual Machine containing all OSGeo software.
- OSGeo4W – a binary distribution of a broad set of open source geospatial software for Windows

=== Retired Projects ===
- Community MapBuilder

== Events ==
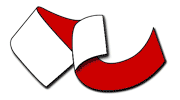
The FOSS4G ribbon.

OSGeo runs an annual international conference called FOSS4G – Free and Open Source Software for Geospatial. Starting as early as 2006, this event has drawn over 1100 attendees (2017 Boston) and the tendency is to increase this number every year. It is the main meeting place and educational outreach opportunity for OSGeo members, supporters and newcomers - to share and learn from one another in presentations, hands-on workshops and a conference exhibition. The FOSS4G ribbon, part of every FOSS4G event logo, symbolizes the flow of ideas, innovation, and sharing within the Open Source geospatial community. The event history dates back to an important face-to-face meeting of the 3 original founders of the event (Venkatesh Raghavan, Markus Neteler, and Jeff McKenna), who met initially in Bangkok Thailand in 2004, and planned to create a new annual event for the whole Open Source geospatial community, with the event named "FOSS4G"; the event would go on to help change the history of the geospatial industry.

FOSS4G-Conferences
Name	Date	Location	Videos
Open Source Free Software GIS - GRASS users conference 2002	11. Sep. – 13. Sep. 2022	Trento (Italy)	45
FOSS4G2006	12. Sep. – 15. Sep. 2006	Lausanne (Switzerland)	
FOSS4G2007	24. Sep. – 27. Sep. 2007	Victoria (Canada)	
FOSS4G2008	29. Sep. – 3. Okt. 2008	Cape Town (South Africa)	
FOSS4G2009	20. Okt. – 23. Okt. 2009	Sydney (Australia)	
FOSS4G2010	6. Sep. – 9. Sep. 2010	Barcelona (Spain)	
FOSS4G2011	12. Sep. – 16. Sep. 2011	Denver (United States)	
FOSS4G2013	17. Sep. – 21. Sep. 2013	Nottingham (United Kingdom)	95
FOSS4G2014	8. Sep. – 13. Sep. 2014	Portland (United States)	188
FOSS4G2015	14. Sep. – 19. Sep. 2015	Seoul (South Korea)	183
FOSS4G2016	22. Aug. – 26. Aug. 2016	Bonn (Germany)	193
FOSS4G2017	14. Aug. – 19. Aug. 2017	Boston (United States)	208
FOSS4G2018	27. Aug. – 2. Sep. 2018	Dar es Salaam (Tanzania)	
FOSS4G2019	26. Aug. – 30. Aug. 2019	Bucharest (Romania)	295
FOSS4G2020	24. Aug. – 29. Aug 2020	Calgary (Canada) cancelled due to COVID-19-Pandemic	
FOSS4G2021	27. Sept. – 2. Okt. 2021	Buenos Aires (Argentina)	237
FOSS4G2022	22. Aug. – 28. Aug 2022	Florenz (Italy)	351
FOSS4G2023	26. Juni – 2. Juli 2023	Prizren (Kosovo)	266
FOSS4G2024	2. Dez. – 8. Dez. 2024	Belém (Brazil)	
FOSS4G2025	17. Nov. – 23. Nov. 2025	Auckland (New Zealand)	
FOSS4G2026	30. Aug. – 5 Sep. 2026	Hiroshima (Japan)	

There are also many regional and local events following this FOSS4G philosophy.

== Community ==
The OSGeo community is composed of participants from everywhere in the world. As of 24 May 2020, there were 35,176 unique subscribers to the more than 384 OSGeo mailing lists. As of September 2012, OSGeo projects were built upon over 12.7 million lines of code contributed by 657 code submitters including 301 that have contributed within the last 12 months.

== Sol Katz Award ==
The Sol Katz Award for Geospatial Free and Open Source Software (GFOSS) is awarded annually by OSGeo to individuals who have demonstrated leadership in the GFOSS community. Recipients of the award have contributed significantly through their activities to advance open source ideals in the geospatial realm.

== See also ==
- List of GIS software
- Comparison of GIS software
- Free Software
- GIS Live DVD
- Open Geospatial Consortium (OGC) – a standards organization
- OpenStreetMap
