= Precisely (company) =

Software company

Precisely Software, LLC
- Type: Private
- Industry: Data Management
- Founded: 1968; 58 years ago in Englewood Cliffs, New Jersey
- Founder: Duane Whitlow and Stan Rintel
- Headquarters: Englewood Cliffs, New Jersey, U.S. (1970s–1980s); Woodcliff Lake, New Jersey (1980s–2010s); Pearl River, New York, U.S. (2010s); Burlington, Massachusetts, U.S. (2020s)
- Key people: Walid Abu-Hadba (CEO)
- Revenue: $600 million (2020)
- Number of employees: 2,000 (2019, 2021)
- Website: precisely.com

Precisely Software, LLC, doing business as Precisely, is a software company specializing in data integrity tools, and also providing big data, high-speed sorting, ETL, data integration, data quality, data enrichment, and location intelligence offerings. The company was originally founded as Whitlow Computer Systems before rebranding as Syncsort Incorporated in 1981, and then to its current form in 2020. Its original, eponymously named product, SyncSort, was the dominant sort program for IBM mainframe computers during much of the 1970s and 1980s.

Precisely is headquartered in Burlington, Massachusetts. As of 2021, the company has more than 12,000 customers, the majority of which are large enterprises, and has more than 2,000 employees. Walid Abu-Hadba is CEO.

== Products ==
=== Groupings ===
Precisely’s portfolio of software and data products is organized into five categories: Integrate for data integration products, including mainframe and IBM i integration and SAP automation products; Verify for data quality, data governance, data observability, and master data management products; Locate for location intelligence products, including geo addressing, spatial analytics, and mapping products; Enrich for data enrichment products; and Engage for customer communication products. Precisely's Data Integrity Suite combines the data integrity products into a single SaaS platform.

=== Individual ===
Product	Type	Description	Platforms	Introduced
Syncsort MFX	Utility	High speed data sort, join, copy. CPU offload to zIIP engines	z/OS	1971
Connect	Data integration	Integrate data seamlessly from legacy systems into next-gen cloud and data platforms including Amazon AWS, Microsoft Azure, Google Cloud Platform, Azure Synapse Analytics, Cloudera, Databricks, Snowflake, Hadoop, Apache Kafka, Apache Spark	Windows, Unix, Linux	2004
Ironstream	Utility	IBM i and z/OS forwarder to Splunk, ServiceNow, Micro Focus, Microsoft SCOM, Elastic and Kafka	z/OS, IBM i	2014
Syncsort Network Management	Monitoring	Network and security monitoring	z/OS, Linux, Windows	2015, through acquisition
Trillium	Data quality	Data cleansing & standardization, customer 360, scalable for big data	Windows, Linux, z/OS	2016
Assure Security	IBM i security	Compliance monitoring, access control, data privacy & encryption, and security risk assessment	IBM i, Windows	2019
Spectrum	Data Management	Complete data management suite, data quality, integration, profiling and monitoring	Windows, Linux	2019, through acquisition
EngageOne	Customer Communication Management	Various elements like personalized, interactive video, a chatbot, document composition and post composition	Windows, Linux, z/OS	2019, through acquisition

== History ==
=== Whitlow Computer Systems: 1968–1981 ===
Logo of Whitlow Computer Systems, used from 1968 to 1981, when the company renamed itself to Syncsort

In 1968, Duane Whitlow and Stan Rintel started Whitlow Computer Systems to develop software for mainframe computers. The result was a business with a niche product portfolio based on high-speed data sorting.

According to Whitlow, the company's original task was to develop an airlines reservations system for Control Data. In the course of that work, the founders encountered timing charts for IBM's existing sort utility, and thought they could build a sort that was much faster. Sales improved after then-startup Computerworld published a front page story about the Syncsort product in 1972. That story helped the company get additional investors, and also resulted in openings in Europe, and the company was one of the first to sell an independent software product in Europe.

The Syncsort product started to sell well in the United States as well. In the IBM mainframe era, many commercial applications revolved around sequential file processing, where master files, often kept on tape storage, were sorted in various orders before being input to application code. In such batch job environments, the sort utility was frequently invoked, and the utility's performance had a significant impact on overall throughput. Syncsort was drop-in replaceable for the IBM sort utility, without having to change JCL statements or application code, and thus was easy to switch to. For some customers, Syncsort was their first non-IBM software purchase.

The company was located in Englewood Cliffs, New Jersey. The primary market for Syncsort was for IBM mainframes running OS/VS1 or MVS operating systems. There were also Syncsort products for two other common IBM mainframe operating environments, those being DOS and VM/CMS.

Aso O. Tavitian was the primary salesman for the company in its early years, and was primarily responsible for its growth. In 1975 he became CEO of the company, and remained in that position until 2008. He became a majority shareholder, then sold a large portion of his stake in the company in 2008, and continued on the company's board of directors through 2015.

=== Syncsort Incorporated: 1981–2020 ===
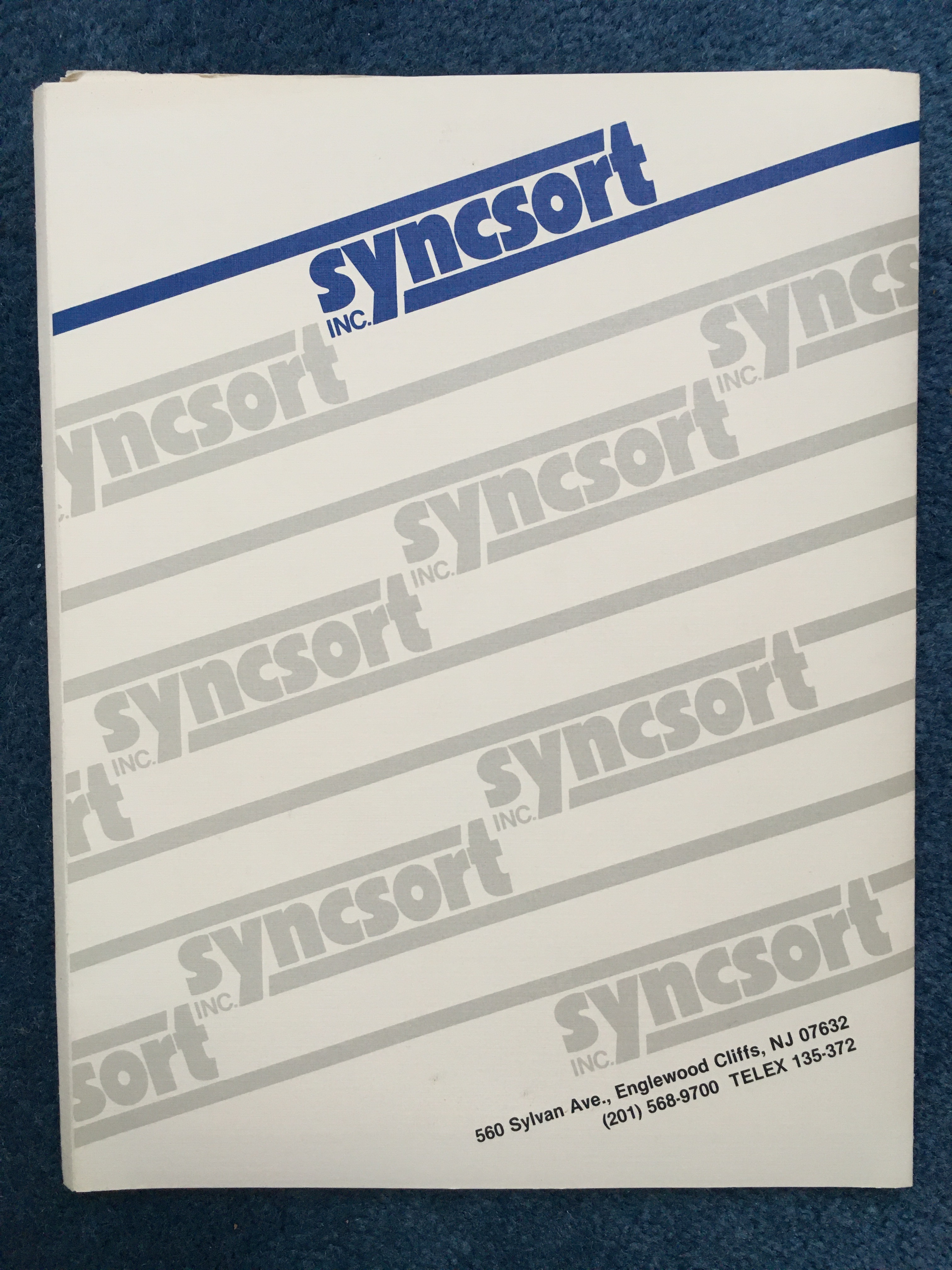
Syncsort presentation folder, from the mid-1980s

Whitlow Computer Systems renamed itself to Syncsort, Inc. around 1981. (At some point the product name was stylized as SyncSort, with the second 'S' capitalized, while the company name retained a regular spelling.) By then, Syncsort had a dominant position in the IBM mainframe world. A survey done by IDC during 1983 of IBM customers running OS/VS1 or MVS revealed that 75 percent of them were using SyncSort, as compared to 18 percent who were using the IBM-provided sort utility and 7 percent who were using other sort programs.

Syncsort also offered the Syback product, for backup/restore functionality. Advertising for Syncsort products was done in-house until 1986.

In the 1990s, the company expanded into client/server environments with a Unix-based sort utility and a backup product. The company also developed data protection technology for Novell, but eventually transitioned its data protection focus to NetApp environments.

Logo of Syncsort used from 1981 to the mid-2000s

In 2004, Syncsort introduced DMExpress, which added extract, transform and load (ETL) integration capabilities, metadata management and improved job management.

In April 2008, Insight Venture Partners, Bessemer Venture Partners, Georgian Partners, Goldman Sachs, and other investors bought a majority interest in Syncsort.

In July 2013, Syncsort announced its data protection business would be spun-off, and later that year it was sold to an investor group led by Bedford Venture Partners and Windcrest Partners. Flavio Santoni, CEO of the newly formed data protection company, told CRN that "I joined Syncsort in 2009, and it was clear the company had two separate businesses: ETL and data protection. Both had different customers and dealt with different purchasing people. They were really two stand-alone businesses."

Later that month, Lonne Jaffe became CEO and Syncsort began a series of acquisitions that broadened its scope into the big data sector. In September 2013 Syncsort acquired Circle Computer Group, a mainframe data migration provider. In March 2015, Syncsort acquired William Data Systems, a network monitoring and security software company.

In October 2015, Clearlake Capital acquired Syncsort. Syncsort's president Josh Rogers was appointed CEO, with Lonne Jaffe remaining as a senior advisor to Syncsort’s board.

In August 2016, Syncsort acquired UK-based Cogito, a mainframe software company. The move underscored Syncsort's focus on linking mainframe database data with big data analytics. In December 2016, the company acquired Trillium, a provider of data quality and master data management tools.

In 2017 Centerbridge Partners acquired Syncsort along with Vision Solutions. Josh Rogers continued as CEO of the merged companies, which continued to operate as Syncsort and use the slogan “Big Iron to Big Data.” The phrase reflected Syncsort's ability to cover mainframe computers as well as cloud-based analytics systems.

In 2019 Syncsort acquired the software and data business of Pitney Bowes in a $700 million transaction backed by affiliates of Centerbridge Partners and Clearlake Capital Group. The deal roughly doubled the company’s size to 2,000 employees and expanded its service offerings to include data enrichment capabilities, such as location services.

=== Precisely: 2020–present ===
In May 2020, Syncsort rebranded itself as Precisely. The new name reflected a pivot towards a broad category of tools centered around data integrity, and the company's service portfolio now included data integration, data quality, data enrichment, location intelligence, and customer engagement.

In March 2021, Clearlake Capital Group, in affiliation with TA Associates, re-acquired Precisely in a deal worth $3.5 billion. Clearlake had sold its majority stake in the company in 2017. The company headquarters soon relocated to Burlington, Massachusetts.

Following the deal, Precisely pursued a series of acquisitions that supported or expanded the company's existing service offerings. In 2021, Precisely acquired: Infogix, a provider of data governance and quality tools; Winshuttle, a Seattle-based automation and data-management company; Anchor Point, a wildfire data, modeling, and risk assessment provider; and CEDAR CX, an SaaS-based customer communications management platform. In January 2022, Precisely acquired PlaceIQ, a location intelligence provider.

In January 2023, Precisely acquired Transerve, co-founded by an IITian graduate Ashwanii Rawat. Transerve is a location intelligence provider in India.
