= GDAL =

Translator library for raster and vector geospatial data formats

- Original author: Frank Warmerdam
- Developer: Open Source Geospatial Foundation
- Release: 8 June 2000; 26 years ago
- Stable release: 3.13.3 / 18 August 2026; 10 days ago
- Written in: C, C++, Python
- Platform: Cross-platform
- Available in: English
- Type: Library
- License: X/MIT
- Website: gdal.org
- Repository: github.com/OSGeo/GDAL

The Geospatial Data Abstraction Library (GDAL) is a computer software library for reading and writing raster and vector geospatial data formats (e.g. shapefile), and is released under the permissive X/MIT style free software license by the Open Source Geospatial Foundation. As a library, it presents a single abstract data model to the calling application for all supported formats. It may also be built with a variety of useful command line interface utilities for data translation and processing. Projections and transformations are supported by the PROJ library.

The related OGR library (OGR Simple Features Library), which is part of the GDAL source tree, provides a similar ability for simple features vector graphics data.

GDAL was developed mainly by Frank Warmerdam until the release of version 1.3.2, when maintenance was officially transferred to the GDAL/OGR Project Management Committee under the Open Source Geospatial Foundation.

GDAL/OGR is considered a major free software project for its "extensive capabilities of data exchange" and also in the commercial GIS community due to its widespread use and comprehensive set of functionalities.

== Supported raster data formats ==
As of version 2.2.3, GDAL/OGR provides at least partial support for 154 raster and 93 vector geospatial data formats. A subset of data formats is supported to ensure the ability to directly create files and georeferencing them with the default GDAL compiling options.

Here follows the list of data formats whose support is, by default, compiled to allow creation and georeferencing.

Raster data format name	Code
Arc/Info ASCII Grid	AAIGrid
ADRG/ARC Digitalized Raster Graphics (.gen/.thf)	ADRG
Bathymetric Attributed Grid (.bag)	BAG
Magellan BLX Topo (.blx, .xlb)	BLX
Microsoft Windows Device Independent Bitmap (.bmp)	BMP
VTP Binary Terrain Format (.bt)	BT
Military Elevation Data (.dt0, .dt1, .dt2)	DTED
ESRI .hdr Labelled	EHdr
NASA ELAS	ELAS
ENVI .hdr Labelled Raster	ENVI
ERMapper (.ers)	ERS
NOAA .gtx vertical datum shift	GTX
HF2/HFZ heightfield raster	HF2
Erdas Imagine (.img)	HFA
Image Display and Analysis (WinDisp)	IDA
ILWIS Raster Map (.mpr,.mpl)	ILWIS
Intergraph Raster	INGR
USGS Astrogeology Isis cube (Version 2)	ISIS2
KMLSUPEROVERLAY	KMLSUPEROVERLAY
In Memory Raster	MEM
Vexcel MFF	MFF
Vexcel MFF2	MFF2 (HKV)
NITF	NITF
NTv2 Datum Grid Shift	NTv2
PCI Geomatica Database File	PCIDSK
Raster Matrix Format (*.rsw, .mtw)	RMF
Idrisi Raster	RST
SAGA GIS Binary format	SAGA
SGI Image Format	SGI
SRTM HGT Format	SRTMHGT
USGS ASCII DEM / CDED (.dem)	USGSDEM
GDAL Virtual (.vrt)	VRT
ASCII Gridded XYZ	XYZ

== Supported vector data formats ==
GDAL supports a variety of vector data formats as seen here. It is extensible as well.
