= Left-leaning red–black tree =

Self-balancing binary search tree data structure

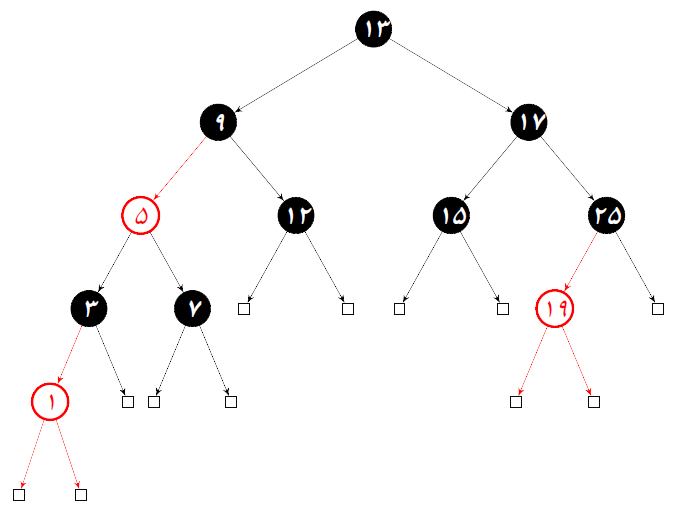
- Type: tree
- Invented: 2008
- Invented by: Robert Sedgewick
Time complexity in big O notation
Operation	Average	Worst case
Search	O(log n)	O(log n)
Insert	O(log n)	O(log n)
Delete	O(log n)	O(log n)
Space complexity
Space	O(n)	O(n)

A left-leaning red–black (LLRB) tree is a type of self-balancing binary search tree, introduced by Robert Sedgewick. It is a variant of the red–black tree and guarantees the same asymptotic complexity for operations, but is designed to be easier to implement.

== Properties ==
A left-leaning red-black tree satisfies all the properties of a red-black tree:

1. Every node is either red or black.
2. A NIL node is considered black.
3. A red node does not have a red child.
4. Every path from a given node to any of its descendant NIL nodes goes through the same number of black nodes.
5. The root is black (by convention).

Additionally, the left-leaning property states that:

6. If a node has only one red child, it must be the left child.

The left-leaning property reduces the number of cases that must be considered when implementing search tree operations.

== Relation to 2–3 and 2–3–4 trees ==
Isomorphism between LLRB trees and 2–3–4 trees

LLRB trees are isomorphic 2–3–4 trees. Unlike conventional red-black trees, the 3-nodes always lean left, making this relationship a 1 to 1 correspondence. This means that for every LLRB tree, there is a unique corresponding 2–3–4 tree, and vice versa.

If we impose the additional requirement that a node may not have two red children, LLRB trees become isomorphic to 2–3 trees, since 4-nodes are now prohibited. Sedgewick remarks that the implementations of LLRB 2–3 trees and LLRB 2–3–4 trees differ only in the position of a single line of code.

== Analysis ==
All of the red-black tree algorithms that have been proposed are characterized by a worst-case search time bounded by a small constant multiple of log N in a tree of N keys, and the behavior observed in practice is typically that same multiple faster than the worst-case bound, close to the optimal log N nodes examined that would be observed in a perfectly balanced tree.

Specifically, in a left-leaning red-black 2–3 tree built from N random keys, Sedgewick's experiments suggest that:

- A random successful search examines log_{2} N − 0.5 nodes.
- The average tree height is about 2 ln N.
- The average size of left subtree exhibits log-oscillating behavior.

== Bibliography ==
- Robert Sedgewick's Java implementation of LLRB from his 2008 paper
- Robert Sedgewick. 20 Apr 2008. Animations of LLRB operations
- Open Data Structures - Section 9.2.2 - Left-Leaning Red–Black Trees, Pat Morin
