= Edward M. McCreight =

American computer scientist

Edward M. (Ed) McCreight
- Education: College of Wooster; Carnegie Mellon University (PhD, 1969)
- Known for: algorithm design, computer design
- Scientific career
- Fields: Computer science
- Workplaces: Boeing, Xerox PARC, Adobe Systems
- Thesis: Classes of Computable Functions Defined by Bounds on Computation
- Doctoral advisor: Albert R. Meyer

Edward Meyers McCreight is an American computer scientist. He received his Ph.D. in computer science from Carnegie Mellon University in 1969, advised by Albert R. Meyer. He co-invented the B-tree with Rudolf Bayer while at Boeing, and improved Weiner's algorithm to compute the suffix tree of a string. He also co-designed the Xerox Alto workstation, and, with Severo Ornstein, co-led the design and construction of the Xerox Dorado computer while at Xerox Palo Alto Research Center. He also worked at Adobe Systems.
