= Rudolf Bayer =

German computer scientist

- Born: March 3, 1939 (age 87)
- Education: University of Illinois at Urbana–Champaign
- Known for: B-tree; UB-tree red–black tree
- Awards: Cross of Merit, First class (1999), SIGMOD Edgar F. Codd Innovations Award (2001)
- Scientific career
- Workplaces: Technical University of Munich
- Thesis: Automorphism Groups and Quotients of Strongly Connected Automata and Monadic Algebras (1966)
- Doctoral advisor: Franz Edward Hohn
- Doctoral students: Christel Baier; Volker Markl

Rudolf Bayer (born 3 March 1939) is a German computer scientist.

He is a professor emeritus of Informatics at the Technical University of Munich where he has been employed since 1972. He is noted for inventing three data sorting structures: the B-tree (with Edward M. McCreight), the UB-tree (with Volker Markl) and the Red–black tree.

Bayer is a recipient of 2001 ACM SIGMOD Edgar F. Codd Innovations Award. In 2005 he was elected as a fellow of the Gesellschaft für Informatik.
