= Intermedia (disambiguation) =

Intermedia, Latin for "across multiple channels", is a concept in the arts.

Intermedia may also refer to:

- Intermedia (hypertext), a hypertext system at Brown University
- InterMedia Partners, a private equity investment firm focused on the media sector
- Intermedia (production company), a film studio
- InterMedia Entertainment Company, a production company founded by Fred Silverman in 1982, later renamed The Fred Silverman Company
- Intermedia (artists' association), a Canadian artists' association active in the late 1960s and early 1970s
- InterMedia, Russia's international media news agency

and also:

- División Intermedia, the second-tier football league in Paraguay
- Kansai Intermedia, a Japanese company broadcasting the FM radio FM Cocolo
- La intermedia, a rural municipality and village in Jujuy Province in Argentina
- Oracle interMedia, a feature providing multimedia utilities in an Oracle database environment
- Precis Intermedia Gaming, a publishing company distributing PDF-based and traditional printed role-playing games

== Biology ==
- Thalassaemia intermedia, a form of the inherited autosomal recessive blood disease Thalassaemia

=== Anatomy ===
- Massa intermedia, the medial surface of the thalamus
- Pars intermedia, the boundary between the anterior and posterior lobes of the pituitary

=== Taxonomy ===
- Acacia aneura var. intermedia, a perennial shrub or tree variety native to Australia
- Amsinckia menziesii var. intermedia, the common fiddleneck or intermediate fiddleneck, a plant species found in western North America
- Balaenoptera musculus intermedia, a subspecies of the blue whale found the Southern Ocean
- Forsythia × intermedia, the border forsythia, an ornamental deciduous shrub species of garden origin
- Hamamelis × intermedia, the hybrid witch hazel, a plant species
- Lavandula × intermedia, the lavendin, the most cultivated lavender species for commercial use
- Meleagris gallopavo intermedia, the Rio Grande wild turkey, a bird subspecies
- Pleurothallis renipetala var. intermedia, a synonym for Acianthera crinita, an orchid species
- Python molurus intermedia, a subspecies of the snake Python molurus
- Rhea americana intermedia, a subspecies of the greater rhea found in Uruguay and extreme southeastern Brazil
- Tiliqua scincoides intermedia, the Northern blue-tongued skink, a lizard species native to Australia

== See also ==
- Intermedium
- Intermedius
