= Multimedia database =

Collection of multimedia data

A Multimedia database (MMDB) is a collection of related for multimedia data. The multimedia data include one or more primary media data types such as text, images, graphic objects (including drawings, sketches and illustrations) animation sequences, audio and video.

A Multimedia Database Management System (MMDBMS) is a framework that manages different types of data potentially represented in a wide diversity of formats on a wide array of media sources. It provides support for multimedia data types, and facilitate for creation, storage, access, query and control of a multimedia database.

== Contents of MMDB ==
A Multimedia Database (MMDB) hosts one or more multimedia data types (i.e. text, images, graphic objects, audio, video, animation sequences). These data types are broadly categorized into three classes:

- Static media (time-independent: image and graphic object).
- Dynamic media (time-dependent: audio, video and animation).
- Dimensional media(3D game and computer aided drafting programs).

=== Comparison of multimedia data types ===
Medium	Elements	Time-dependence
Graphic	Vectors, regions	No
Image	Pixels	No
Audio	Sound, Volume	Yes
Video	Raster images, graphics	Yes

Additionally, a Multimedia Database (MMDB) needs to manage additional information pertaining to the actual multimedia data. The information is about the following:

- Media data: the actual data representing an object.
- Media format data: information about the format of the media data after it goes through the acquisition, processing, and encoding phases.
- Media keyword data: the keyword descriptions, usually relating to the generation of the media data.
- Media feature data: content dependent data such as contain information about the distribution of colours, the kinds of textures and the different shapes present in an image.

The last three types are called metadata as they describe several different aspects of the media data. The media keyword data and media feature data are used as indices for searching purpose. The media format data is used to present the retrieved information.

== Requirements of Multimedia databases ==
Like the traditional databases, Multimedia databases should address the following requirements:

- Integration
  - Data items do not need to be duplicated for different programs invocations
- Data independence
  - Separate the database and the management from the application programs
- Concurrency control
  - Allows concurrent transactions
- Persistence
  - Data objects can be saved and re-used by different transactions and program invocations
- Privacy
  - Access and authorization control
- Integrity control
  - Ensures database consistency between transactions
- Recovery
  - Failures of transactions should not affect the persistent data storage
- Query support
  - Allows easy querying of multimedia data

Multimedia databases should have the ability to uniformly query data (media data, textual data) represented in different formats and have the ability to simultaneously query different media sources and conduct classical database operations across them. (Query support)

They should have the ability to retrieve media objects from a local storage device in a good manner. (Storage support)

They should have the ability to take the response generated by a query and develop a presentation of that response in terms of audio-visual media and have the ability to deliver this presentation. (Presentation and delivery support)

== Issues and challenges ==
- Multimedia data consists of a variety of media formats or file representations including TIFF, BMP, PPT, IVUE, FPX, JPEG, MPEG, AVI, MID, WAV, DOC, GIF, EPS, PNG, etc. Because of restrictions on the conversion from one format to the other, the use of the data in a specific format has been limited as well. Usually, the data size of multimedia is large such as video; therefore, multimedia data often require a large storage.
- Multimedia database consume a lot of processing time, as well as bandwidth.
- Some multimedia data types such as video, audio, and animation sequences have temporal requirements that have implications on their storage, manipulation and presentation, but images, video and graphics data have special constraints in terms of their content.

== Application areas ==
Examples of multimedia database application areas:

- Digital Libraries
- News-on-Demand
- Video-on-Demand
- Music database
- Geographic Information Systems (GIS)
- Telemedicine

== See also ==
- Databases
- Multimedia
- Oracle Multimedia
- Spatial database
- Spatiotemporal database
