= International School of Software, Wuhan University =

School of Wuhan University, China

- 武汉大学国际软件学院
- Established: March, 2002
- Dean: Huaibei Zhou
- Academic staff: 46
- Location: Wuhan, Hubei, China
- Campus: Urban
- Website: iss.whu.edu.cn

The International School of Software at Wuhan University was established in March 2002. The school is administered independently and has put an emphasis on internationalized education.

The school has 46 full-time and part-time faculty members. Among them, two are academicians of the Chinese Academy of Sciences and the Chinese Academy of Engineering.

The school is involved in research and application development in software engineering, spatial information systems and digital engineering, multi-media digital technology, digital art design, visualization technology, information security, software reliability, quality assurance software systems, software development tools and environment, biological information engineering, financial information systems, software development, and IC design.

== Education Plan ==
Undergraduate Majors: Software Engineering, Spatial Information & Digital Techniques.

Time Duration: 4 years Total Credits Required: 155

Graduate Majors: Software Engineering, Spatial Information & Digital Techniques, Digital Arts & Game Design, Communication Software & Protocol Engineering, Bioinformatics, Financial Information Engineering, Integrated Circuit Design & Applications.

Time Duration: 2 years – 3 years Total Credits Required: 40

== Curriculum ==
Software Engineering: Mathematical Modeling & Optimization, Database Principles & Applications, Object-oriented Program Design, Software Procedure Management, Software System Structure, Linux Analysis, Database & Data Studies, Software Development Model.

Digital Arts & Game Design: Planar Design, Movie Photography, Business Illustration, Cartoon Design, Game Frame Design, Mobile Game Development.

Spatial information and digital design: Web-based spatial information technology, GIS information technology, GPS technology, Simulation and virtual reality technology, Spatial Database, 3S Integration and Application.

Bioinformatics: Introduction to Bioinformatics, Genetics, Molecular Biology, Biology Data Mining.

Financial Information Engineering: Financial Information Systems, Modern Finance, Introduction to Economics, Modern Investment.

Communications software and Protocol engineering: Network Protocol design, Communication Software design methods, Wireless Communication Principles & Application, Modern Communications Networks.

IC Design and Applications: VLSI Design Introduction, IC Design Automation, Microelectronics Introduction, ASIC Design, SOC Design, VHDL & Verilog Languages.
