= SQS =

SQS can mean:

- Amazon Simple Queue Service, a hosted message queue service for web applications.
- Spatial Query Server, Boeing Spatial Query Server (SQS) - Spatial Database
- The ICAO-Code from Susi Air, an Indonesian Airline
