= Oracle Text =

Search engine and text analysis software

Oracle Text is search engine and text analysis software developed and sold by Oracle Corporation. It is proprietary software, sold as part of Oracle Database, a proprietary relational database management system.

When integrated with a text storage system, it can analyze text and provide text-filtering and text-reduction for speed-reading and summary-viewing. It can return grammatical assessments of the text it processes, checking for grammatical errors and rating the quality and style of the writing.

== History ==
Oracle Corporation introduced Oracle ConText first as a software option, then as an Oracle data cartridge (a server-based software module) for text retrieval when it released version 8 of the Oracle database in 1997. It used the default schema CTXSYS and the default tablespace DRSYS.

With the appearance of version 8i of the Oracle database in 1999, a re-designed ConText became Oracle interMedia Text — part of the separately-priced Oracle interMedia bundle of products.

With the release of version 9i of the database in 2001 Oracle Corporation renamed the software as Oracle Text and again marketed it as a standalone subsystem, integrated with and included in the cost of the database software.

Oracle Corporation continues to support Oracle Text as of Oracle Database release 12 (2013).

== Implementation ==
Oracle Text uses the ctx library.

== See also ==
- Oracle Ultra Search
