= Spatiotemporal database =

Database managing time and space information

A spatiotemporal database is a database that manages both space and time information. Common examples include:

- Tracking of moving objects, which typically can occupy only a single position at a given time.
- A database of wireless communication networks, which may exist only for a short timespan within a geographic region.
- An index of species in a given geographic region, where over time additional species may be introduced or existing species migrate or die out.
- Historical tracking of plate tectonic activity.

Spatiotemporal databases are an extension of spatial databases and temporal databases. A spatiotemporal database embodies spatial, temporal, and spatiotemporal database concepts, and captures spatial and temporal aspects of data and deals with:

- Geometry changing over time and/or
- Location of objects moving over invariant geometry (known variously as moving objects databases or real-time locating systems).

== Implementations ==
Although there exist numerous relational databases with spatial extensions, spatiotemporal databases are not based on the relational model for practical reasons, chiefly among them that the data is multi-dimensional, capturing complex structures and behaviours.

As of 2008, there are no RDBMS products with spatiotemporal extensions. There are some products such as the open-source TerraLib which use a middleware approach storing their data in a relational database. Unlike in the pure spatial domain, there are however no official or de facto standards for spatiotemporal data models and their querying. In general, the theory of this area is also less well-developed. Another approach is the constraint database system such as MLPQ (Management of Linear Programming Queries).

GeoMesa is an open-source distributed spatiotemporal index built on top of Bigtable-style databases using an implementation of the Z-order curve to create a multi-dimensional index combining space and time.

SpaceTime is a commercial spatiotemporal database built on top of the proprietary multidimensional index similar to the k-d tree family, but created using the bottom-up approach and adapted to particular space–time distribution of data. In a study conducted by Ericsson, SpaceTime significantly outperformed GeoMesa.

== See also ==
- Geographic information system § Adding the dimension of time
- Historical geographic information system
- Locating engine
- Multimedia database
- Structure mining
- Time geography
