= GeoMesa =

- Developers: LocationTech, CCRi
- Stable release: 5.4.0 / 8 October 2025; 2 months ago
- Repository: github.com/locationtech/geomesa
- Written in: Scala
- Operating system: Linux
- Type: Spatiotemporal database
- License: Apache License 2.0
- Website: www.geomesa.org

GeoMesa is an open-source, distributed, spatio-temporal index built on top of Bigtable-style databases using an implementation of the Geohash algorithm.

== Description ==
Written in Scala, GeoMesa is capable of ingesting, indexing, and querying billions of geometry features using a highly parallelized index scheme. GeoMesa builds on top of open source geo (OSG) libraries. It implements the GeoTools DataStore interface providing standardized access to feature collections as well as implementing a GeoServer plugin.

Google announced that GeoMesa supported the Google Cloud Bigtable hosted NoSQL service in their release blog post in May 2015. GeoMesa also supports Bigtable-derivative implementations Apache Accumulo and Apache HBase. GeoMesa implements a Z-order curve via a custom Geohash implementation to combine three dimensions of geometry and time (i.e. latitude/longitude/timestamp) into a single-dimension lexicographic key space provided by Accumulo.
