= Whitney covering lemma =

In mathematical analysis, the Whitney covering lemma, or Whitney decomposition, asserts the existence of a certain type of partition of an open set in a Euclidean space. Originally it was employed in the proof of Hassler Whitney's extension theorem. The lemma was subsequently applied to prove generalizations of the Calderón–Zygmund decomposition.

Roughly speaking, the lemma states that it is possible to decompose an open set by cubes each of whose diameters is proportional, within certain bounds, to its distance from the boundary of the open set. More precisely:

Whitney Covering Lemma—Let $\Omega$ be an open non-empty proper subset of $\mathbb{R}^n$. Then there exists a family of closed cubes $\{Q_j\}_j$ such that

- $\cup_j Q_j = \Omega$ and the $Q_j$'s have disjoint interiors.
- $\sqrt{n} \ell(Q_j) \leq \mathrm{dist}(Q_j, \Omega^c) \leq 4 \sqrt{n} \ell(Q_j).$
- If the boundaries of two cubes $Q_j$ and $Q_k$ touch then $\frac{1}{4} \leq \frac{\ell(Q_j)}{\ell(Q_k)} \leq 4.$
- For a given $Q_j$ there exist at most $12^n Q_k$'s that touch it.

Where $\ell(Q)$ denotes the edge length of a cube $Q$.

The main idea of the proof is to use a quadtree (in two dimensions), octree (in three dimensions), or their higher dimensional equivalents. This is a recursive subdivision of space into cubes, which may each be subdivided into $2^d$ smaller cubes, so that the edge lengths are (positive or negative) powers of two and the vertex coordinates are integer multiples of the edge length. To obtain the Whitney covering, one may start with a subdivision of space into unit cubes, and then repeatedly remove any cube exterior to the given set, subdivide any cube that contains both interior and exterior points of the set or that has a too-small neighboring cube, and un-subdivide any cube for which this simplification would leave the result interior to the given set and not having any too-small neighbors, until these operations are exhausted.
