= Whitney extension theorem =

Partial converse of Taylor's theorem

In mathematics, in particular in mathematical analysis, the Whitney extension theorem is a partial converse to Taylor's theorem. Roughly speaking, the theorem asserts that if A is a closed subset of a Euclidean space, then it is possible to extend a given function of A in such a way as to have prescribed derivatives at the points of A. It is a result of Hassler Whitney.

== Statement ==
A precise statement of the theorem requires careful consideration of what it means to prescribe the derivative of a function on a closed set. One difficulty, for instance, is that closed subsets of Euclidean space in general lack a differentiable structure. The starting point, then, is an examination of the statement of Taylor's theorem.

Given a real-valued C^{m} function f(x) on R^{n}, Taylor's theorem asserts that for each a, x, y ∈ R^{n}, there is a function R_{α}(x,y) approaching 0 uniformly as x,y → a such that

$f({\mathbf x}) = \sum_{|\alpha|\le m} \frac{D^\alpha f({\mathbf y})}{\alpha!}\cdot ({\mathbf x}-{\mathbf y})^{\alpha}+\sum_{|\alpha|=m} R_\alpha({\mathbf x},{\mathbf y})\frac{({\mathbf x}-{\mathbf y})^\alpha}{\alpha!}$	1

where the sum is over multi-indices α.

Let f_{α} = D^{α}f for each multi-index α. Differentiating (1) with respect to x, and possibly replacing R as needed, yields

$f_\alpha({\mathbf x})=\sum_{|\beta|\le m-|\alpha|}\frac{f_{\alpha+\beta}({\mathbf y})}{\beta!}({\mathbf x}-{\mathbf y})^{\beta}+R_\alpha({\mathbf x},{\mathbf y})$	2

where R_{α} is o(|x − y|^{m−|α|}) uniformly as x,y → a.

Note that (2) may be regarded as purely a compatibility condition between the functions f_{α} which must be satisfied in order for these functions to be the coefficients of the Taylor series of the function f. It is this insight which facilitates the following statement:

Theorem. Suppose that f_{α} are a collection of functions on a closed subset A of R^{n} for all multi-indices α with $|\alpha|\le m$ satisfying the compatibility condition (2) at all points x, y, and a of A. Then there exists a function F(x) of class C^{m} such that:

1. F = f_{0} on A.
2. D^{α}F = f_{α} on A.
3. F is real-analytic at every point of R^{n} − A.

Proofs are given in the original paper of Whitney (1934), and in Malgrange (1967), Bierstone (1980) and Hörmander (1990).

== Extension in a half space ==
Seeley (1964) proved a sharpening of the Whitney extension theorem in the special case of a half space. A smooth function on a half space R^{n,+} of points where x_{n} ≥ 0 is a smooth function f on the interior x_{n} for which the derivatives ∂^{α} f extend to continuous functions on the half space. On the boundary x_{n} = 0, f restricts to smooth function. By Borel's lemma, f can be extended to a smooth function on the whole of R^{n}. Since Borel's lemma is local in nature, the same argument shows that if $\Omega$ is a (bounded or unbounded) domain in R^{n} with smooth boundary, then any smooth function on the closure of $\Omega$ can be extended to a smooth function on R^{n}.

Seeley's result for a half line gives a uniform extension map

$$\displaystyle{E:C^\infty(\mathbf{R}^+)\rightarrow C^\infty(\mathbf{R}),}$$

which is linear, continuous (for the topology of uniform convergence of functions and their derivatives on compacta) and takes functions supported in [0,R] into functions supported in [−R,R]

To define $E,$ set

$$\displaystyle{E(f)(x)=\sum_{m=1}^\infty a_m f(-b_mx)\varphi(-b_mx) \,\,\, (x < 0),}$$

where φ is a smooth function of compact support on R equal to 1 near 0 and the sequences (a_{m}), (b_{m}) satisfy:

- $b_m > 0$ tends to $\infty$;
- $\sum a_m b_m^j = (-1)^j$ for $j \geq 0$ with the sum absolutely convergent.

A solution to this system of equations can be obtained by taking $b_n = 2^n$ and seeking an entire function

$$g(z)=\sum_{m=1}^\infty a_m z^m$$

such that $g\left(2^j\right) = (-1)^j.$ That such a function can be constructed follows from the Weierstrass theorem and Mittag-Leffler theorem.

It can be seen directly by setting

$$W(z)=\prod_{j \ge 1} (1-z/2^j),$$

an entire function with simple zeros at $2^j.$ The derivatives W '(2^{j}) are bounded above and below. Similarly the function

$$M(z)=\sum_{j \ge 1} {(-1)^j\over W^\prime(2^j) (z-2^j)}$$

meromorphic with simple poles and prescribed residues at $2^j.$

By construction

$$\displaystyle{g(z)=W(z)M(z)}$$

is an entire function with the required properties.

The definition for a half space in R^{n} by applying the operator E to the last variable x_{n}. Similarly, using a smooth partition of unity and a local change of variables, the result for a half space implies the existence of an analogous extending map

$$\displaystyle{C^\infty(\overline{\Omega}) \rightarrow C^\infty(\mathbf{R}^n)}$$

for any domain $\Omega$ in R^{n} with smooth boundary.

== See also ==
- The Kirszbraun theorem gives extensions of Lipschitz functions between Hilbert spaces.
- Tietze extension theorem – Continuous maps on a closed subset of a normal space can be extended
- Hahn–Banach theorem – Theorem on extension of bounded linear functionals
- Whitney covering lemma, on covering open sets by cubes, used by Whitney to prove the extension theorem
