= Raphael Finkel =

American computer scientist (born 1951)

Raphael Finkel (born 1951) is an American computer scientist and a retired professor at the University of Kentucky. He compiled the first version of the Jargon File. He is the author of An Operating Systems Vade Mecum, a textbook on operating systems, and Advanced Programming Language Design, an introductory book on programming paradigms. Finkel and J.L. Bentley created the data structure called the quadtree.

== Biography ==
Finkel was born in Chicago. He entered the University of Chicago, where he earned his BA in mathematics and MA in teaching. He then earned a PhD at Stanford University under the supervision of Vinton Cerf.

Finkel is also an activist for the survival of the Yiddish language, promoting its use and providing fonts, various texts, and tools for writing Yiddish in personal computers.
