= Oracle Ultra Search =

Oracle Corporation's Oracle Ultra Search (also known as Ultrasearch) allows the generation of indexes to textual material stored (for example) on web-servers, file-servers, databases and mail-systems. It uses crawlers and Oracle Text utilities to build its indexes, which it then makes available within an Oracle database.

Oracle Corporation makes Ultrasearch available free-of-charge to customers who purchase an Oracle database, an Oracle Application Server or the Oracle Collaboration Suite.

By default, Oracle Ultra Search uses the WKSYS schema and the DRSYS tablespace.

== History ==
Oracle Search originated with Oracle 9i.
