= Apache Sedona =

Data analysis software

- Other names: GeoSpark
- Original authors: Jia Yu, Mohamed Sarwat
- Developer: Apache Software Foundation
- Release: December 10, 2017; 8 years ago
- Available in: Scala, Java, SQL, Python, R,
- License: Apache 2.0
- Website: sedona.apache.org
- Repository: https://github.com/apache/sedona

Apache Sedona (formerly GeoSpark) is an open-source framework designed for processing and analyzing large-scale spatial data in a distributed computing environment. It originated as GeoSpark in 2010 by researchers at Arizona State University and later entered incubation with the Apache Software Foundation in 2020. It graduated as a top-level project in February 2023.

== Overview ==
Sedona is a framework that facilities distributed geospatial data processing. It integrates with Apache Spark, Apache Flink, Snowflake and includes Spatial Datasets and Spatial SQL functions to loading, processing, and analyzing large-scale geospatial data across systems. It supports spatial data formats, including GeoJSON, Well Known Text and Well-Known Binary as well as multiple coding languages, including Java, Python, R, Scala, and SQL.

== History ==
The project was initiated as GeoSpark by Jia Yu and Mohamed "Mo" Sarwart at Arizona State University in 2010. In 2020, the project was submitted to the Apache Software Foundation and graduated in 2023.

== See also ==
- List of Apache Software Foundation projects
