= IVUE =

Live Picture multi-view
- Filename extension: .ivue
- Type code: 'IVUE'
- Type of format: Raster graphics
- Extended to: FlashPix

The IVUE file format is an image format used by Live Picture, a discontinued image application. It chunks an image into tiles and stores multiple quarter-downscaled versions of one image. It is supported by Adobe Photoshop 3.0 through 7.0. The image format is extended to FlashPix.

The format is discussed in European patent EP0691011A1, or US Patent US5790708A. In addition to viewing, it is intended to allow users to edit on a lower-resolution version (to save data), while applying the edit operations to the full-resolution version.
