= Acacia aneura var. intermedia =

Scientific classification
- Kingdom: Plantae
- Clade: Tracheophytes
- Clade: Angiosperms
- Clade: Eudicots
- Clade: Rosids
- Order: Fabales
- Family: Fabaceae
- Subfamily: Caesalpinioideae
- Clade: Mimosoid clade
- Genus: Acacia
- Species: A. aneura
- Variety: A. a. var. intermedia

Trinomial name
- Acacia aneura var. intermedia Pedley

Variety of shrub or small tree

Acacia aneura var. intermedia is a perennial shrub or tree native to Australia.

This variety is a form of the mulga, Acacia aneura, a relatively long-lived species of genus Acacia.

== See also ==
- List of Acacia species
