= HHCode =

Computer data storage format

A Helical Hyperspatial Code, also known as an HHCode, is a data storage format for very large spatio-temporal datasets.

The development of HHCode can be traced to efforts in the 1990's by Edric Keighan, Panagiotis A. Vretanos, Michael Galluchon, and Herman P. Varma while working for the Canadian Hydrographic Service's Atlantic regional offices at the Bedford Institute of Oceanography in Dartmouth, Nova Scotia. CHS was facing a problem with storing very large spatial datasets acquired during hydrographic surveys (thus having a temporal element) and was seeking a method to store the datasets in a relational database structure.

CHS scientists reportedly conceptualized a spatio-temporal indexing system during a hydrographic survey onboard CCGS Hudson on Georges Bank during the summer of 1989. The indexing system involved an adaptation of a Riemannian hypercube data structure, invoking a helical spiral through 3-dimensional space, which allowed for n-size of features.

The actual implementation of the proposed indexing system was termed a helical hyperspatial code and it was first used by modifying an installation of the Oracle database version 4. The HHCode indexing system permitted a highly efficient compression of not only spatial data but other data types as well, while improving search and retrieval times. The HHCode comprises a form of space filling curve and the concept was published by the CHS scientists in the International Hydrographic Review.

Oracle Corporation subsequently learned of the innovation which led to an agreement with the Government of Canada which saw the CHS scientists working with a team of Oracle programmers at an office in Hull, Quebec during the early 1990s to redevelop the Oracle database kernel. The resulting software was the Oracle database version 7, with the Spatial Data Option (SDO). Subsequent development of the SDO has resulted in the Oracle Spatial extension to current Oracle databases.

With the HHCode being an open-source data format, several spatial data and software companies have adopted it in various products targeted at very large corporate data users, namely Helical Systems Inc. and CubeWerx.
