= La intermedia =

Coordinates: 22°25′16″S 65°42′00″W

- Rural municipality and village
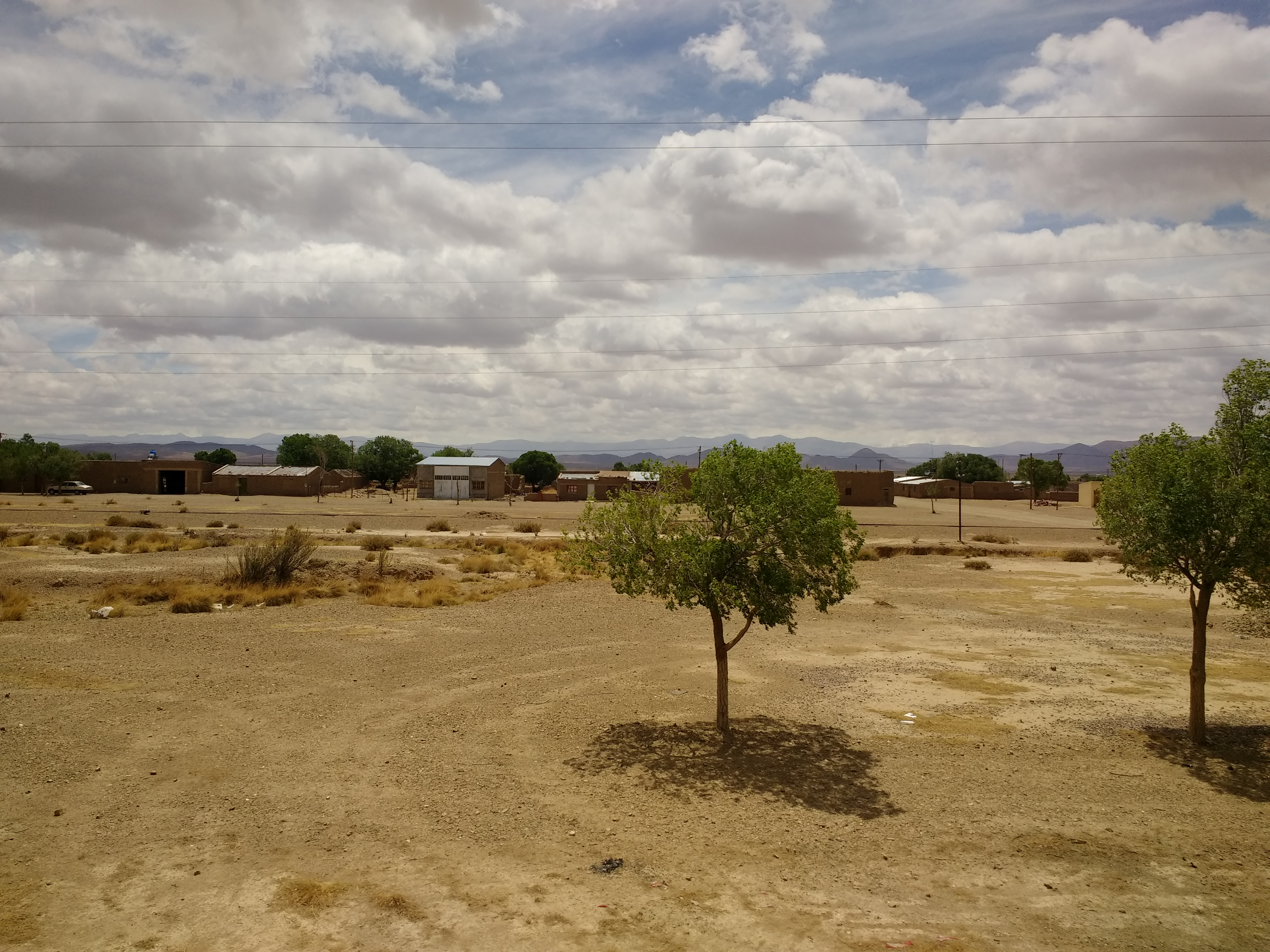
- Interactive map of La intermedia
- Country: Argentina
- Province: Jujuy Province
- Time zone: UTC−3 (ART)

La intermedia is a rural municipality and village in Jujuy Province in Argentina.
