= Spatial Query Server =

Boeing Spatial Query Server

- Screenshot of SQS Viewer running under Windows
- Developer: The Boeing Company
- Release: December 2001
- Stable release: 3.6 / November 2007
- Operating system: SGI, Solaris, Linux, Windows 2000, 2003 & XP
- Type: Geodatabase
- License: Pay Licensed Closed Source/Proprietary
- Website: Boeing SQS

The Boeing Company's Spatial Query Server is a commercially available product which enables a Sybase database to contain spatial features.

== Geometric types ==
- Circle
- Ellipse
- Point - a point in 2D space. (x,y) plane.
- Voxel - a point in 3D space. (x,y,z) volume.
- Polygon
- Polygon(n)
- Polygon set
- Gpolygon
- Gpolygon(n)
- Gpolygon_set
- Line
- Line(n)
- Line_set
- Rectangle
- Rectangle_set
- Llbox
- Llbox_set

== See also ==
- Sybase Spatial Implementation
