= HP Information Management Software =

HP Information Management Software is a software from the HP Software Division, used to organize, protect, retrieve, acquire, manage, and maintain information. The HP Software Division also offers information analytics software. The amount of data that companies have to deal with has grown tremendously over the past decade, making the management of this information more difficult. The University of California at Berkeley claims the amount of information produced globally increases by 30 percent annually. An April 2010 Information Management article cited a survey in which nearly 90 percent of businesses blame poor performance on data growth. The survey concluded that for many businesses their applications and databases are growing by 50 percent or more annually, making it difficult to manage the rapid expansion of information.

The HP Software Division offers many information management and analytics software products through its HP Autonomy business, resulting from the acquisition of Autonomy Corporation in 2011. Autonomy provided capabilities for managing unstructured data.

The acquisition of Vertica in 2011 added information analytics for managing structured data.

In June 2013, HP announced the HAVEn analytics platform for managing big data—consisting of both structured and unstructured data.

== Products ==
In April 2011, HP Software Division announced a refresh and upgrade of its HP Information Management Software portfolio, including enhancements to HP TRIM Records Management System, HP Data Protector, Integrated Archive Platform, Database Archiving, HP Storage Essentials, and a number of IT consulting and professional services. The portfolio included a methodology and the technology and services for companies and government organizations to create a holistic approach to information management.

Through the acquisition of Autonomy Corporation, the HP information management and analytics software portfolio now include data protection, eDiscovery, information analytics, unified information access, information archiving, enterprise content management, and marketing optimization. In 2013, HP announced cloud services support and support for marketing and call center applications.

=== Data protection ===
HP data protection software includes server, virtual server, remote and branch office, and endpoint device data protection. Products include HP Connected Backup, HP LiveVault, and HP Data Protector

HP Data Protector software automate high-performance backup and recovery from disk or tape to enable 24x7 business continuity. This software can be used by any size business as it grows, from a single server environment to the largest distributed enterprise infrastructure with thousands of clients and as many as 100,000 sessions daily.

=== eDiscovery ===
HP eDiscovery help meet the requirements of legal Electronic discovery and compliance regulations. They meet the Electronic Discovery Reference Model (EDRM)[5] for capturing, classifying, preserving, finding, analyzing, and recovering information. HP eDiscovery is part of the HP Autonomy Legal and Compliance Performance Suite for detecting and acting on new signals of risk, understanding, protecting, governing, and collaborating on information, as well as maintaining compliance with local, federal, and international regulations.

=== Analytics ===
Information analytics is the collection and analysis of data. The use of powerful computers to identify patterns and trends in a data set is not new, but has been greatly enhanced in the past few years. As a result, the quality of the output is high enough to be used as a tool in the decision-making process.

Based on HP IDOL (Intelligent Data Operating Layer), HP Information Analytics help organizations extract meaning from all forms of human information such as audio, text and video. HP IDOL uses advanced pattern-matching technology to understand key concepts in all forms of information, including free text, video, audio, image, social media and the web. Unlike traditional, keyword-dependent systems, HP IDOL retrieves all relevant information that is conceptually related to a query, going beyond search to help users discover the information they may not know to look for.

=== Archiving ===
HP sells archiving products.

They can be delivered as enterprise-class software on premises, through the cloud or in a hybrid model.

=== Enterprise content management ===
HP offers the Autonomy ECM Suite for enterprise content management. With HP Autonomy ECM, organizations can access and understand almost any data type or system, as well as control, leverage and take action on this information in concert with internal or regulatory policies. The current version is 9.0, released in January 2013.

In October 2013, HP Exstream joined the HP Autonomy business within the HP Software Division, adding new content management capabilities to the portfolio. HP Exstream is a customer communications management system.

=== Marketing optimization ===
HP Autonomy's Marketing Optimization includes contact center management, marketing analytics, rich media management, Web experience management, Web optimization and search engine marketing.

In October 2013, HP announced the HP Digital Marketing Hub for dynamically identifying customer segments, building prescriptive models that match segments to targeted campaigns, and engaging customers in real-time across advertising, contact center, mobile, print, social, and web touch points.

=== HP Vertica ===
The grid-based, column-oriented, HP Vertica Analytics Platform is designed to manage large, fast-growing volumes of data and provide very fast query performance when used for data warehouses and other query-intensive applications.

=== HAVEn ===
In June 2013, HP announced the HAVEn platform for analyzing and finding meaning from big data—petabytes of structured and unstructured information. HAVEn also aims to identify information that is not needed and can be placed in low cost storage or even dumped. HAVEn uses the open-source Hadoop software with technologies HP acquired from Autonomy, Vertica and ArcSight.

== User groups ==
While it is not an actual "user group", the ITRC is an online forum about HP Software and Solutions products. A new user group, the HP Software Solutions Community, officially launched publicly in April 2010 and includes all former software-related communities. In June 2011, HP Software announced a new Discover Performance community and online resource center designed to serve IT executives and CIOs.

== See also ==
- DIRKS, Design and Implementation Of Record Keeping Systems
- The National Archives (UK), The National Archives
- Picture archiving and communication system
- Design Criteria Standard for Electronic Records Management Software Applications
- Paperless Office
- Document Management
- Document Imaging
