= Glacio-geological databases =

Data on historical ice-sheet activity

Glacio-geological databases compile data on glacially associated sedimentary deposits and erosional activity from former and current ice-sheets, usually from published peer-reviewed sources. Their purposes are generally directed towards two ends: (Mode 1) compiling information about glacial landforms, which often inform about former ice-flow directions; and (Mode 2) compiling information which dates the absence or presence of ice.

These databases are used for a variety of purposes: (i) as bibliographic tools for researchers; (ii) as the quantitative basis of mapping of landforms or dates of ice presence/absence; and (iii) as quantitative databases which are used to constrain physically based mathematical models of ice-sheets.

Antarctic Ice Sheet: The AGGDB is a Mode 2 glacio-geological database for the Antarctic ice-sheet using information from around 150 published sources, covering glacial activity mainly from the past 30,000 years. It is available online, and aims to be comprehensive to the end of 2007.

British Ice Sheet: BRITICE is a Mode 1 database which aims to map all glacial landforms of Great Britain.

Eurasian Ice Sheet: DATED-1 is a Mode 2 database for the Eurasian ice-sheet. Its sister-project DATED-2 uses the information in DATED-1 to map the retreat of the Eurasian ice-sheet since the Last Glacial Maximum.

== See also ==
- Glacial landforms
- Sediment
- Geology
- Ice sheet
- Exposure Age Dating
- Radio-carbon dating
