= Oracle Multimedia =

- Original author: Oracle Corporation
- Developer: Oracle Corporation
- Operating system: Cross-platform
- Available in: English
- Type: Software framework
- License: Proprietary software
- Website: Official website

Oracle Multimedia (formerly Oracle interMedia from versions 8 to 10gR2) is a feature available for Oracle databases, which provides multimedia utilities in a database environment, generating as a result a multimedia database (MMDB). Oracle Multimedia was deprecated in Oracle 18c and desupported in Oracle 19c.

== Functionalities ==
Oracle Multimedia is a framework which:

- as a general-purpose feature enables the management and retrieval of image, audio, and video data
- recognizes the most popular multimedia formats and can automate metadata extraction and basic image-processing
- facilitates the development of multimedia applications using JSPs, servlets, PL/SQL (with new packages) or tools such as JDeveloper (ADF/UIX) and Oracle Portal.

Oracle Multimedia manages multimedia data within an Oracle database under transaction control (see transaction processing); using by default database schemas named ORDSYS and ORDPLUGINS (the "ORD" prefix designates "object-relational data").

ORDSYS provides four media classes:

- ORDAudio
- ORDDoc
- ORDImage
- ORDVideo

Alternatively, an Oracle database can use Oracle Multimedia to store and index meta-information together with external references that enable efficient access to media-content stored outside the database.

== See also ==
- Oracle Spatial and Graph
