= OpenRailwayMap =

Open railway mapping software project

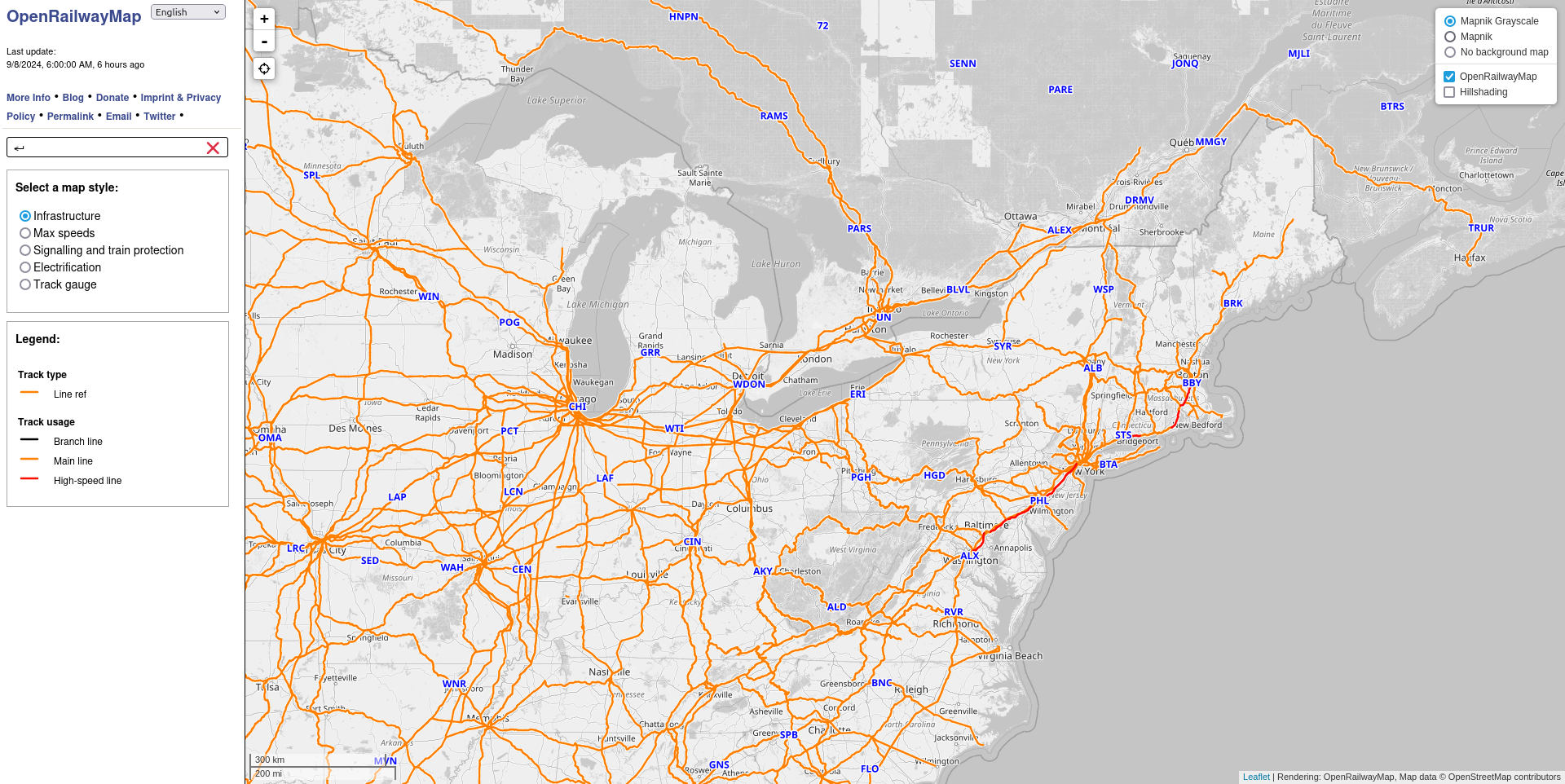
- OpenRailwayMap section of northeastern US and southeastern Canada
- Website type: Collaborative mapping
- Owner: Community-owned
- Products: Geographic data
- Website: www.openrailwaymap.org
- Commercial: No
- Registration: Required for contributors, not required for viewing
- Launched: 2013; 13 years ago
- Current status: Active
- Content license: Various

OpenRailwayMap-vector
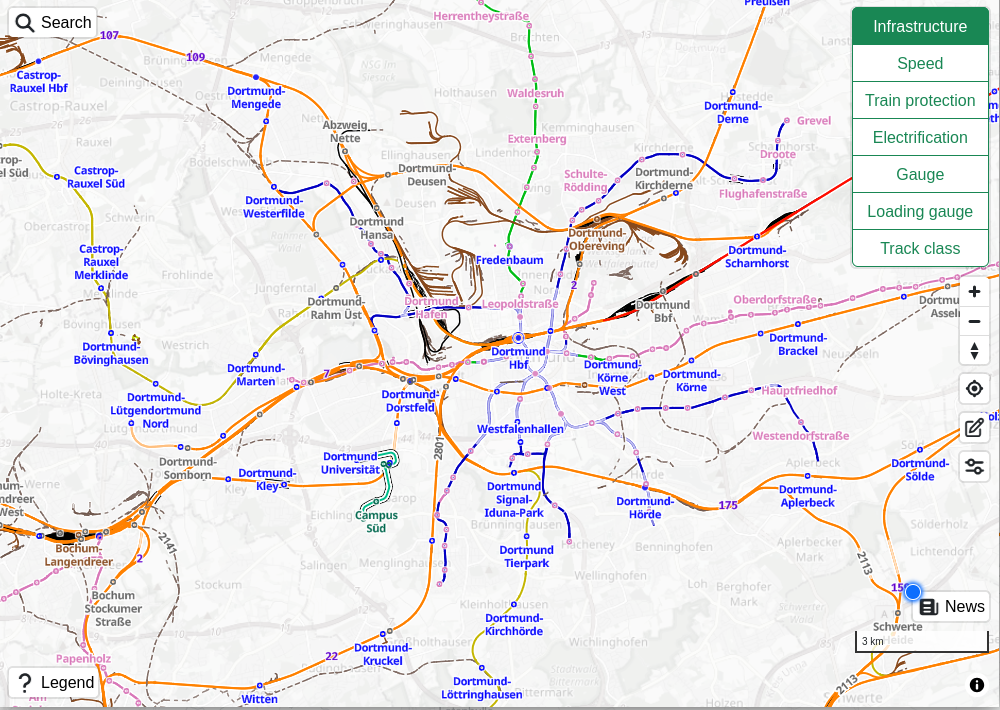
- OpenRailwayMap-vector section of Dortmund, Germany
- Website type: Collaborative mapping
- Available in: English
- Area served: Worldwide
- Owner: Community-owned
- Products: Geographic data
- Website: openrailwaymap.app
- Advertising: No
- Commercial: No
- Registration: Required for contributors, not required for viewing
- Launched: 2024; 2 years ago
- Current status: Active
- Content license: Various

OpenRailwayMap (ORM) is an online collaborative mapping project developing a worldwide railway map using technology based on the OpenStreetMap project. The project is part of the OpenStreetMap database, and acts as a renderer for the existing OpenStreetMap database to include additional information for railroad lines worldwide. The project was launched in 2013.

== History ==
The project was started in 2011. The OpenRailwayMap website was launched in mid 2013. The map originally supported both raster tiles and vector tiles, but support for the latter was dropped in 2017 due to poor performance. A fork of OpenRailwayMap with a more modern vector tile implementation was announced in 2025.

== Contents ==
OpenRailwayMap contains data for railway line positions, as well as the following information about them: track type (i.e. bridge, tunnel, regular line); track line type and current use (i.e. main, branch, yard; construction, disused, abandoned); max rail speeds; train protection; track electrification and track voltage if applicable; and track gauge.

== Applications ==
Some of the uses for OpenRailwayMap are as follows: scientific models/simulations, data for model train enthusiasts, track information for trainspotters, and routing/public transport.

As well as the project website there is also a mobile app available for Android devices.

=== API ===
OpenRailwayMap has a public and free (albeit limited-use) API. It is designed for small-scale applications. Users can query for information such as rail locations and data related to the rail.

== Contributing ==
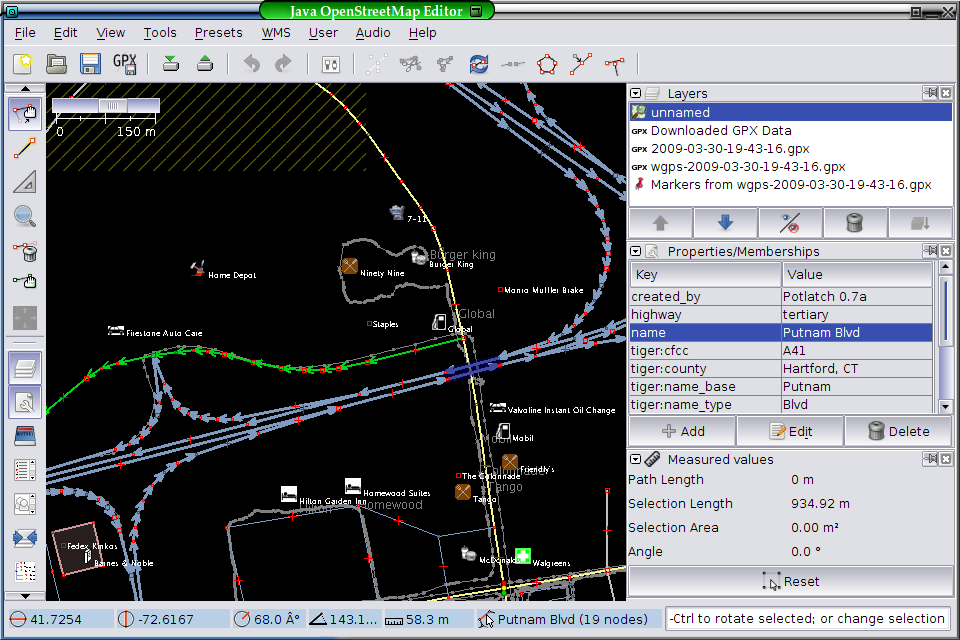
JOSM editor

OpenRailwayMap allows anyone to contribute in many ways, such as:

- Creating data using photography or GPS trackers and sending it to experienced project editors
- Using the JOSM desktop editing tool to expand the database (Registration required with a verified email address, no registration required to view data)
- Contributing to the project's open source code

=== Internationalization ===
OpenRailwayMap is available to users in around 22 languages.
