= SCEE =

SCEE may refer to:

- Sony Computer Entertainment Europe, the European division of Sony Computer Entertainment and its defunct development unit Team Soho
- School of Civil and Environmental Engineering, a constituent college of the National University of Sciences and Technology, Pakistan
- StreetComplete Expert Edition fork, an OpenStreetMap editor software
