= Google Mapathon =

Annual mapathon event organized by Google

Google Mapathon was an annual mapathon event organized by Google that invited the public to make improvements to Google Maps, through the Google Map Maker. It was permanently discontinued in 2016 because Google Map Maker was discontinued.

The event was held for the first time in 2013 in India, and subsequently in 2014 in Australia. The program ran into trouble waters in India as it was accused of including critical military-sensitive areas.

== 2013 ==
The India mapathon took place from 12 February to 25 March. Aimed at increasing the amount of local information, prizes, in the form of 10 Samsung Galaxy Note 800's, 40 Samsung Galaxy S II GT I9100's, and 50 Flipkart gift coupons worth Rs. 5000.

Over 26,000 participants made 2 million contributions to Google Maps, a total of 800,000 POIs (points of interest) were added which included 22,000 health/emergency POIs, 30,000 stores and 52,000 restaurants/eateries.

Google named Vishal Saini as the winner of the tournament with 32077 points. Saini had mapped the city of Pathankot, which is close to military installations. The Survey of India informed the company of its violations of the laws and filed a complaint. Google responded by saying that the company was ready to discuss any concerns. On March 21, the Surveyor-General asked Google to stop the event, stating that it did not have permission before launching the mapathon.

The only rules of the Mapathon were that you had to be a resident of India and only edits made in India would count.

== 2014 ==
The 2014 edition of the contest was held in Australia from March 24 to April 20. The top 315 mappers were given prizes.
