= MapTiler =

Swiss provider of custom online maps

MapTiler AG
- Company type: Private
- Industry: Maps
- Founded: 2018; 8 years ago
- Headquarters: Zug, Switzerland
- Key people: Petr Pridal (CEO)
- Website: maptiler.com

MapTiler is a Swiss provider of custom online maps for websites and applications.

== History ==
MapTiler was one of the companies pioneering map tile implementation. It started as an open source software product in 2008 used by libraries to turn digitised paper maps into tiled web maps. MapTiler converts data into tiles that can be used as a slippy map on a website. A set of tiles is created for each zoom level along with an XML file.

By 2018, MapTiler had become a maps API with the capability of providing ad-free personalised maps in both online and offline environments. These developments along with the inclusion of satellite imagery from Sentinel-2 and Airbus led to them being winners of the Airbus Multi-Data Challenge organised as part of the Copernicus Masters 2018.

== Data sources and technology ==
The maps provided by MapTiler are created using open data sources, such as OpenStreetMap and ESA, and from purchased proprietary data sources, such as Maxar Technologies.

The original MapTiler software for turning raster images and vector geographical data into map tiles for interactive maps became MapTiler Desktop.
