= OpenStreetMap Foundation =

British non-profit organization

- Founded: 22 August 2006; 20 years ago
- Type: Company limited by guarantee
- Registration no.: 05912761
- Location: St John's Innovation Centre, Cowley Road, Cambridge, CB4 0WS, England, United Kingdom
- Coordinates: 52.55098°N 1.81860°W
- Expenses: £933,300 (expenses for 2026)
- Website: osmfoundation.org

The OpenStreetMap Foundation (abbreviated OSMF) is a British non-profit organisation whose aim is to support and enable the development of freely-reusable geospatial data. Founded in 2006, it is closely connected with the OpenStreetMap project, although its constitution does not prevent it supporting other projects.

== History ==
The OpenStreetMap Foundation was registered in England and Wales on 22 August 2006 as a company limited by guarantee. In 2007, it held the first State of the Map conference in Manchester.

In October 2009, the foundation announced that its members, rather than the OpenStreetMap contributors at large, would vote on changing OpenStreetMap's data license from Creative Commons Attribution-ShareAlike to the Open Database License.

In 2014, the foundation began accepting corporate memberships in an "associate member" (nonvoting) category. The initial corporate members were Geofabrik, Geotab, Naver, NextGIS, and Mapbox. In 2017, the foundation started giving corporate sponsors of a certain level to have a seat on the advisory board. In 2018, GlobalLogic was implicated in a coordinated effort to sign up employees as individual members.

Active contributors membership program was introduced in August 2020. As per this active contributors to OpenStreetMap through editing (at least 42 active days in the latest period of one year) or off-line activities can apply for free of cost membership. They will have voting rights for electing board members.

In June 2021, the foundation stated that the effects of Brexit have prompted them to consider a move back into the European Union due to issues with database rights, difficulties with getting charitable status for the foundation, and the increasing difficulty of using PayPal and banking in the United Kingdom. The foundation has not announced the location of its new headquarters. As of February 2024, the candidates for relocation are Belgium and Luxembourg.

By the end of 2022, the foundation had recognized 18 local chapters worldwide, including OSM Austria, supporting regional growth and community engagement.

== Governance ==
The OpenStreetMap Foundation is a membership organization. Membership in the foundation is separate from a user account on the OpenStreetMap website: a user account is required to contribute to the map, while foundation membership entitles one to vote at a general meeting.

The foundation is run by a board of seven members, including the foundation's officers: chairman, secretary and treasurer.

Several working groups, composed mostly of volunteers, carry out day-to-day operations on behalf of the foundation:

- Data Working Group – counter vandalism and dispute resolution
- Communication Working Group
- Engineering Working Group
- Legal or Licensing Working Group – trademark and licensing issues
- Local Chapters Working Group
- Membership Working Group
- Operations Working Group
- State of the Map Organizing Committee

Several local chapters are affiliated with the OpenStreetMap Foundation. The local chapter for Italy is Wikimedia Italia, which is also a chapter of the Wikimedia Foundation.

== Programs and initiatives ==
The OpenStreetMap Foundation promotes and supports the OpenStreetMap project, but does not formally own the project or its contents. The foundation's relatively low profile in OpenStreetMap's development has been contrasted with the Wikimedia Foundation's relationship to Wikipedia.

In addition to day-to-day operations within the OpenStreetMap project, the foundation and its working groups run several initiatives to promote the project's growth. Its annual State of the Map conference is the flagship conference within the OpenStreetMap community. The GPStogo program lends GPS receivers to mappers in developing countries.

== Notable people ==
- Steve Coast – former board chairman emeritus; founder of OpenStreetMap
- Allan Mustard – former board member; retired U.S. ambassador

== See also ==
- Open Knowledge Foundation
