= Overture Maps Foundation =

Project providing open map data

The Overture Maps Foundation is an open data mapping collaboration, launched in mid-December 2022 under the auspices of the Linux Foundation. Its stated mission is "powering current and next-generation map products by creating reliable, easy-to-use, and interoperable open map data." Overture founding members were Amazon, Meta, Microsoft and TomTom.

The Overture project is intended to be complementary to the crowdsourced OpenStreetMap project, and the foundation encourages members to contribute data directly to the OSM project.

Data will be released under the Community Data License Agreement – Permissive v2, unless required otherwise by licensing conflicts.

== Releases ==
In April 2024, the Foundation released the first version of its dataset, as part of a beta test of its service. The data is available in GeoParquet, an incubating Open Geospatial Consortium standard that adds interoperable geospatial types to Apache Parquet, format via Amazon AWS and Microsoft Azure.

The schema for the system is still under development.
