= JOSM =

Free and open source editor for OpenStreetMap

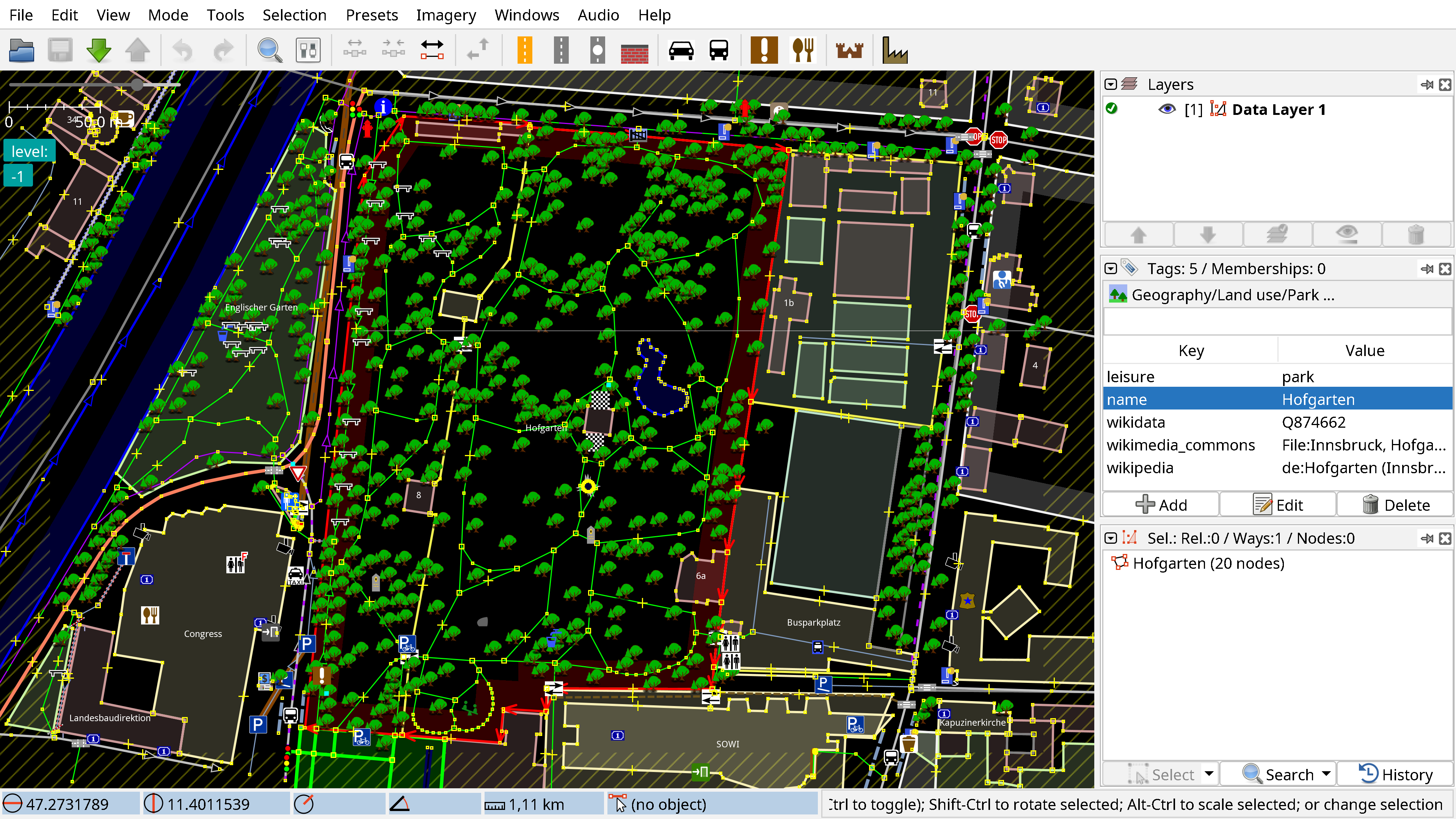
- JOSM with single OpenStreetMap data layer displayed
- Original author: Immanuel Scholz
- Developers: Dirk Stöcker and other contributors
- Release: January 22, 2006; 20 years ago
- Stable release: 19613 / 11 August 2026; 2 months ago
- Written in: Java
- Platform: Cross-platform
- Available in: 44 languages
- Type: GIS software
- License: GNU GPL v2
- Website: josm.openstreetmap.de
- Repository: josm.openstreetmap.de/svn/trunk

JOSM (Java OpenStreetMap editor) is a free software desktop editing tool for OpenStreetMap geodata created in Java, originally developed by Immanuel Scholz and currently maintained by Dirk Stöcker. The editing tool contains advanced features that are not present in OSM's default online editor, iD.

== Features ==
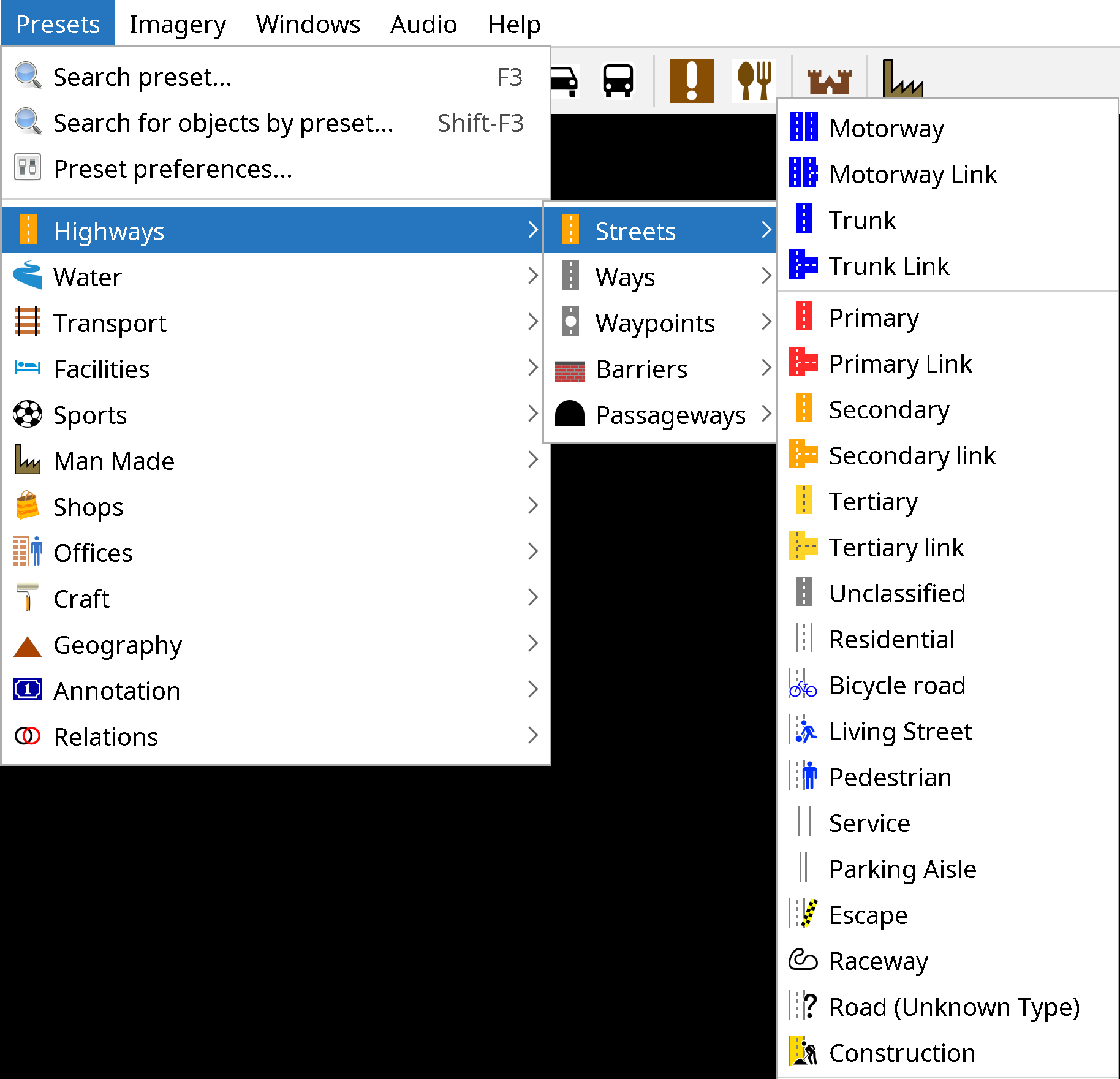
JOSM highway presets menu

Some notable features of JOSM are importing GPX files (GPS tracks), working with aerial imagery (including WMS, TMS and WMTS protocols), support for multiple cartographic projections, layers, relations editing, data validation tools, data filtering, offline work, presets and rendering styles. JOSM provides more than 200 keyboard shortcuts for the core functions.

Many additional features (like tools for drawing buildings, adding Wikipedia links or viewing data in 3D) are available through the plugins. There are more than 100 of them in the repository.

== History ==
- The first changeset was created on 27 September 2005.
- The first beta version (which required Java 5) was made available on 4 October 2005 and JOSM 1.0 was released on 22 January 2006.
- The current versioning scheme, using code changeset number, was introduced in 2008.
- In 2014 the project logo was replaced with new one, which won a design contest. From this year stable releases are identified with additional YY.MM internal version number (following r6763 – 14.01), however they may not exactly reflect the release date.
- Since revision 10786 (16.07) released on 12 August 2016, support for Java versions earlier than 8 has been dropped.
- Compatibility with Java 9 added on 2 September 2017, revision 12712 (17.08).
- JOSM logo refreshed on 8 August 2019 to the current artwork.
- Java 16 support added on 18 March 2021 Since revision 17580 (21.02).
- JOSM had new macOS and Windows installers that both ship Java 16 and JavaFX 16 and Debian launcher required openjfx since revision 18193 (21.08) released on 2 November 2021.

== Usage ==
The highest number of edits in OSM are done using JOSM. The software was used to perform several large scale OSM imports, including TIGER data in the United States.

JOSM can also be used for editing an OSM sister project OpenHistoricalMap. It's included as a package in many Linux distributions like Ubuntu, Debian, Fedora, Arch Linux and the OSGEO Live DVD

Various tutorials are available. The LearnOSM Tutorial, translated in 16 languages, has a section on JOSM. It covers the editing process, the tools, the plugins, the presets, the imagery functionalities, conflict resolution and other features.
