= Mapathon =

Collaborative mapping event

A mapathon (sometimes written map-a-thon) is a coordinated mapping event and a kind of editathon. The public is invited to make online map improvements in their local area to improve coverage and to help disaster risk assessment and energy management.

Mapathons use an online site for storing map data, such as OpenStreetMap. Google Maps was also an option until 2017. A mapathon is organized by a respective organization or a non-profit organisation or local government.

Mapathons are often held inside (armchair mapping) in a room with strong Wi-Fi for simultaneous access, assisted by satellite imagery. Mapathons can also be an outside activity with online simultaneous map editing assisted by global positioning system trackers on mobile devices.

== History ==
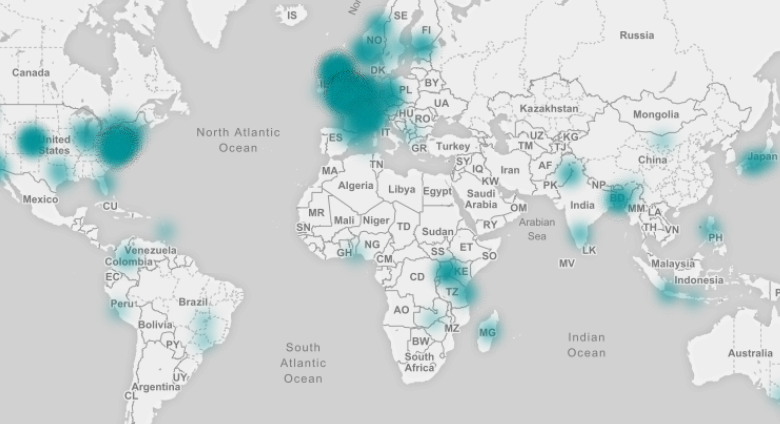
Missing maps mapathon events distribution for November, 2016. Image by OpenStreetMap and Missing Maps.

In 2009, in Atlanta, the capital of the US state of Georgia, United States, about 200 volunteers walked around the city with GPS-enabled devices and expanded OpenStreetMap.

Google Mapathon was an annual event organized by Google that invited the public to make improvements to Google Maps, through the Google Map Maker. Google Map Maker was officially shut down on March 31, 2017.

In February and March, 2013, in India, volunteers mapped local areas on Google Maps. The prizes included Samsung Galaxy Note tablets. Some locals, including the competition winner Vishal Saini, mapped sensitive military installations in Pathankot. In March 2013, a right-wing Bharatiya Janata Party member of parliament Tarun Vijay told authorities that mapping the area was against India's national map policy. Delhi police investigated the incident. Survey of India, an Indian government mapping agency, contacted Google. Google responded by denying the claim and asserting that the mapping was legal. In January 2016, following an attack on the military structures in Pathankot, the Delhi High Court ruled Google to appear in Court in February, but did not make any rulings restricting Google from continuing to host the map data online.

In May 2015, after a 7.9 earthquake in Nepal, online volunteers expanded the map of Nepal for two weeks. They mapped 4,000 mapping volunteers have edited 91,951 times, 29,798 segments of road and 243,500 buildings, and also expanded maps of Botswana and Philippines. The project was supported by MapGive and by the Humanitarian OpenStreetMap Team.

In May 2015, at a White House event celebrating citizen's cartography, about 80 volunteers edited and added more than 400 roads and 1,000 buildings in OpenStreetMap. The volunteers added power outage information on 152 utilities, and mapped US parks.

In February 2016 in a hotel in central Paris, France, about 60 volunteers helped the Missing Maps humanitarian project to preemptively map vulnerable parts of the world on OpenStreetMap. They used satellite imagery and field data to add 4,000 buildings and nearly 170 kilometers (105 miles) of road in Uganda. Another twelve mapathons were scheduled to take place in US and Europe.

In the same month, February 2016, Missing Maps also organized a mapathon in Grenoble to map Tsangano district, Tete, Mozambique to help a local conflict between the country main party and the opposition. The Grenoble Missing Maps mapathon photos are included below.

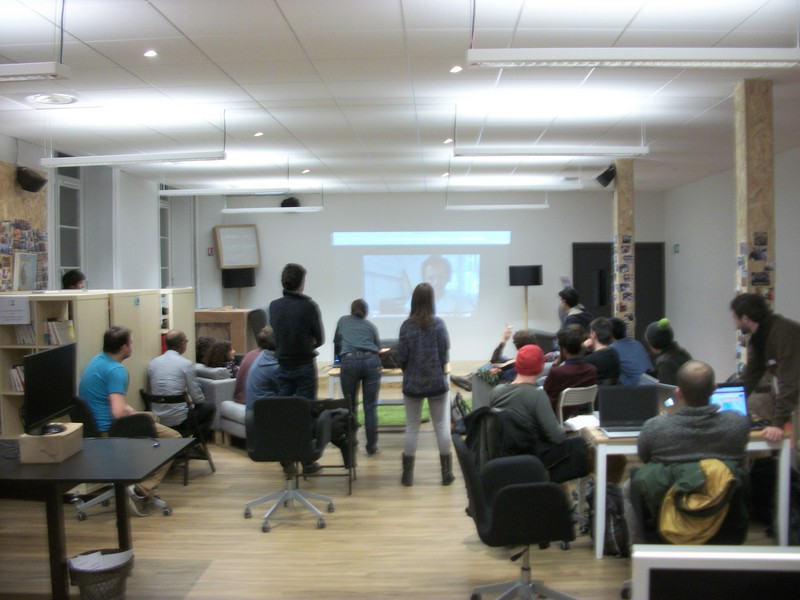

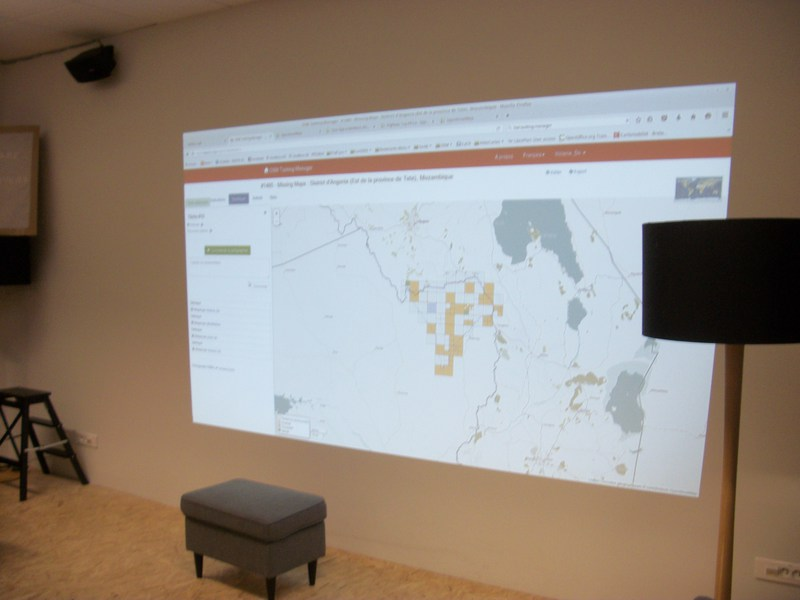

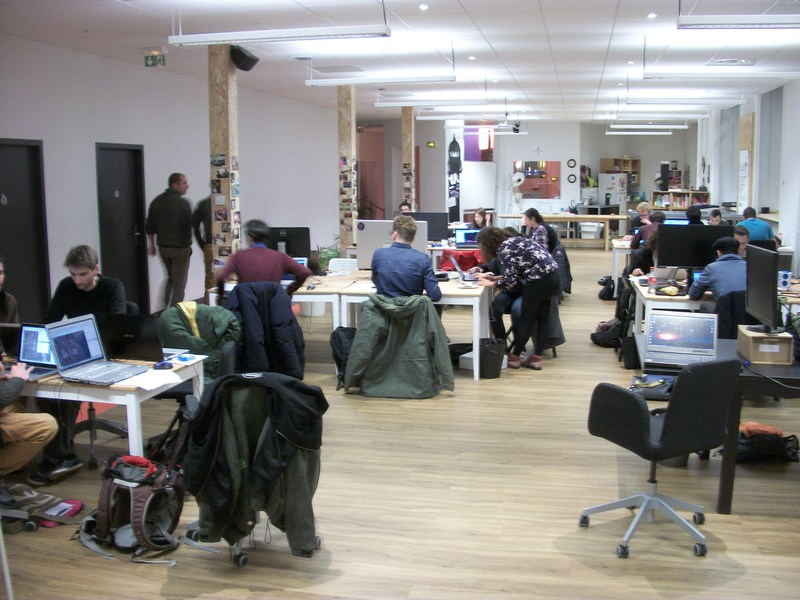
