= Missing Maps =

Open collaborative humanitarian mapping project

- Missing Maps logo.
- Formation: November 2014; 11 years ago
- Region served: Worldwide
- Affiliations: OpenStreetMap Foundation
- Website: missingmaps.org

Missing Maps is a humanitarian mapping initiative among a group of organizations that aims to map parts of the world that are vulnerable to natural disasters, conflicts, and disease epidemics. It was founded in November 2014 by the American Red Cross, British Red Cross, Humanitarian OpenStreetMap Team, and Médecins Sans Frontières/Doctors Without Borders and has so far mapped large towns, cities and rural areas in countries such as South Sudan, the Democratic Republic of the Congo, and the Central African Republic.

== Background ==
The idea to create the Missing Maps project was born out of a realisation by the American Red Cross, British Red Cross, Humanitarian OpenStreetMap Team, and Médecins Sans Frontières that maps are pivotal to delivering humanitarian aid. In civil wars, for example, maps can help individuals and organisations track the movement of internally displaced populations and determine where best to conduct food and non-food item distributions. Or in the case of disease outbreaks, emergency responders can use maps to identify the source of the outbreak and identify the most effective infection control methods. Baraka in the Democratic Republic of the Congo at the end of 2014 became one of the pilot projects.

The project is aimed at preemptively mapping vulnerable parts of the world to create highly detailed maps that will be ready for first-responders to use in the event of a disaster, conflict, or disease epidemic. It relies on a large volunteer community to map these areas through online, remote mapping in the initial phases. Once these digital maps are validated by experienced mappers, they are then sent to field teams to be updated and revised.

=== Objectives ===
1. To map areas where people live at risk of disasters and crises by contributing to OpenStreetMap (OSM) so that individuals, communities and organizations can use the data and maps to better prepare and respond.
2. To support OpenStreetMap, specifically the Humanitarian OpenStreetMap Team (HOT), in developing technologies, skills, workflows, and communities.

=== Ethics ===
- Openness: Using OpenStreetMap ensures that all data gathered under the project banner will be free, open and available for use under OpenStreetMap's open license.
- Collaboration: All local mapping and data collection is to be done in collaboration with local people and in a respectful manner at all times.
- Sustainability: When mapping a city, there needs to be a plan in place to ensure that access to technology and training for those living in that community will continue to be available for mapping afterwards. Missing Maps projects emphasize building, and leaving behind, local capacity and access. Rapid data collection without significant local participation is to be avoided.
- Involvement: Members of the Missing Maps project actively contribute to the Missing Maps project objectives, the OpenStreetMap repository and benefitting communities, both local and international.
- Participation: Missing Maps activities are designed to be accessible and open for participation for individuals who want to contribute towards the project objectives.

== Mapping process ==
The mapping process is largely driven by demands in the field. Humanitarian organisations identify areas of vulnerability that are then set as tasks on the HOT tasking manager for remote mapping. Once an area has been mapped and validated, the maps are sent to field staff who work with local people to travel to the mapped areas and input names of streets and key buildings and check for errors. After this step, the maps are deemed ready for use and made available online for free.

=== Identifying areas of vulnerability ===
As the mapping is done preemptively, the first step largely involves field staff from MSF, the British Red Cross, and the American Red Cross engaging in dialogue together to identify key areas of vulnerability. They understand the challenges of implementing field projects and are often engaged in delivering frontline humanitarian assistance. Sometimes these challenges are about understanding the locations of malnourished children or the direction that a disease is spreading. When head offices are notified of such challenges, the Missing Maps project activates an online task for remote mapping.

=== Remote mapping ===
Once the task is online on the HOT tasking manager, the three humanitarian organisations and HOT alert their supporters through social media, e-mail, and communities to the mapping need. Volunteers trace buildings, streets, swamps, rivers, and all other landmarks onto satellite imagery using the tasking manager. Then volunteer validators check the map that has been created and determine whether it is ready for field mapping or not.

=== Field mapping ===
After the maps have been declared ready for field mapping, they are printed out by humanitarian volunteers on the ground. They work in collaboration with locals from the community to collect local data about road names, settlements, the natural landscape, and the exact locations of the people they are trying to help. This information is then put into the online map and declared ready for use.

=== Data entry ===
With detailed maps validated in the field by locals themselves, humanitarian organisations can use the mapped information to plan risk reduction and disaster response activities that save lives.
