= Vector Map =

Vector-based collection of geographic information system (GIS) data about Earth

The Vector Map (VMAP), also called Vector Smart Map, is a vector-based collection of geographic information system (GIS) data about Earth at various levels of detail. Level 0 (low resolution) coverage is global and entirely in the public domain. Level 1 (global coverage at medium resolution) is only partly in the public domain.

There are ongoing discussions about making most of the information available in the public domain.

== Description ==
- Coordinate reference system: Geographic coordinates stored in decimal degrees with southern and western hemispheres using negative values for latitude and longitude, respectively.
- Horizontal Datum: World Geodetic System 1984 (WGS 84).
- Vertical Datum: Mean Sea Level.

=== Thematic data layers ===
Features and data attributes are tagged utilizing the international Feature and Attribute Coding Catalogue (FACC).

1. major road networks
2. railroad networks
3. hydrologic drainage systems
4. utility networks (cross-country pipelines and communication lines)
5. major airports
6. elevation contours
7. coastlines
8. international boundaries
9. populated places
10. index of geographical names

== Levels of resolution ==
The vector map product are usually seen as being of three different types: low resolution (level 0), medium resolution (level 1) and high resolution (level 2).

=== Level Zero (VMAP0) ===
Level 0 provides worldwide coverage of geo-spatial data and is equivalent to a small scale (1:1,000,000). The data are offered either on CD-ROM or as direct download, as they have been moved to the public domain. Data are structured following the Vector Product Format (VPF), compliant with standards MIL-V-89039 and MIL-STD 2407.

==== Data sets ====
The entire coverage has been divided into four data sets:

1. North America (NOAMER) v0noa
2. Europe and North Asia (EURNASIA) v0eur
3. South America, Africa, and Antarctica (SOAMAFR) v0soa
4. South Asia and Australia (SASAUS) v0sas

=== Level One (VMAP1) ===
Level 1 data are equivalent to a medium scale resolution (1:250,000). Level 1 tiles follow the MIL-V-89033 standard.

- Horizontal accuracy: 125–500m
- Vertical accuracy: 0.5–2 Contour Interval (for example: if contour interval 50 m, accuracy will be 25 to 100m)

==== Data sets ====
VMAP Level 1 is divided in 234 geographical tiles. Only 57 of them are currently (2006) available for download from NGA. Among the available datasets, coverage can be found for parts of Costa Rica, Libya, United States, Mexico, Iraq, Russia, Panama, Colombia and Japan.

=== Level Two (VMAP2) ===
Level 2 data are equivalent to a large scale resolution. Level 2 tiles follow the MIL-V-89032 standard.

- Horizontal accuracy: 50–200m
- Vertical accuracy: 0.5–2 Contour Interval (for example: if contour interval 50 m, accuracy will be 25–100m)

== Debate about availability of data ==
The USA Freedom of Information Act and the Electronic Freedom of Information Act guarantee access to virtually all GIS data created by the US government. Following the trend of the United States, much of the VMAP data has been offered to the public domain.

But many countries consider mapping and cartography a state monopoly; for such countries, the VMAP Level1 data are kept out of the public domain. However, some data may be commercialised by national mapping agencies, sometimes as a consequence of privatisation.

Various public groups are making efforts to have all VMAP1 data moved to the public domain in accordance with FOIA.

Further steps have been taken by the Free World Maps Foundation and others to have the data licensed under the GNU General Public License, while remaining copyrighted, as an alternative to the public domain. This is an ongoing debate (as of 2006).

== Copyrights ==
=== VMAP0 ===
The U.S. government has released the data into public domain, with the following conditions imposed (quotation from VMAP0 Copyright Statement):

As an agency of the United States government, NIMA makes no copyright claim under Title 17 of the United States Code with respect to any copyrightable material compiled in these products, nor requires compensation for their use.

When incorporating the NIMA maps into your product, please include the following:

a. "this product was developed using materials from the United States National Imagery and Mapping Agency and are reproduced with permission",
b. "this product has neither been endorsed nor authorized by the United States National Imagery and Mapping Agency or the United States Department of Defense".

With respect to any advertising, promoting or publicizing of this product, NIMA requires that you refrain from using the agency's name, seal, or initials.

The VMAP0 download page states:

Internal data reference to the CD-ROM being "LIMITED DISTRIBUTION" should be ignored.

However, all is not quite what it seems. There is a 'readme1.txt' file located in the v0eur, v0sas, and v0soa directories. This file contains information saying that layers: Boundaries Coverage and the Reference Library, are copyrighted to the Environmental Systems Research Institute.

If these copyrighted layers are not used there is no violation of any copyrights.

== Tools to read and convert VMAP data ==
- VPFView (V2.1) - developed by NIMA, is available from NGA or USGS (as part of the NIMAMUSE package); this tool can render simple plots and export GIS data to other GIS file formats
- "OGR with OGDI driver": this free software tool can convert VMAP format to standard GIS file formats such as SHAPE, PostGIS etc.

== History ==
National Geospatial Intelligence Agency

- 1991–1993: The National Imagery and Mapping Agency (NIMA) develops the Digital Chart of the World (DCW) for the US Defense Mapping Agency (DMA) with themes including Political/Ocean Populated Places, Railroads, Roads, Utilities, Drainage, Hypsography, Land Cover, Ocean Features, Physiography, Aeronautical, Cultural Landmarks, Transportation Structure and Vegetation. One of the sources for the data was the Operational Navigation Chart that compiles military mapping from Australia, Canada, United Kingdom, and the United States.

VMAP (level 0) is a slightly more detailed reiteration of the DCW.
VMAP (level 1) has much higher resolution data.

- 2004 The National Imagery and Mapping Agency (NIMA) is renamed to National Geospatial-Intelligence Agency which will include other mapping agencies such as the Defense Mapping Agency (DMA), the Central Imagery Office (CIO) and the Defense Dissemination Program Office (DDPO). All VMAP data will subsequently be distributed through the NGA.

== See also ==
- Natural Earth, free, high-quality global map data
- Digital Chart of the World
- GSHHS, a high-resolution shoreline data set
- GADM, a high-resolution database of country administrative areas
- Digital Elevation Model
- GIS
- DIGEST VRF and VPF are related and compatible with a few exceptions
- Vector tiles
