= Steve Coast =

British computer programmer (born 1980)

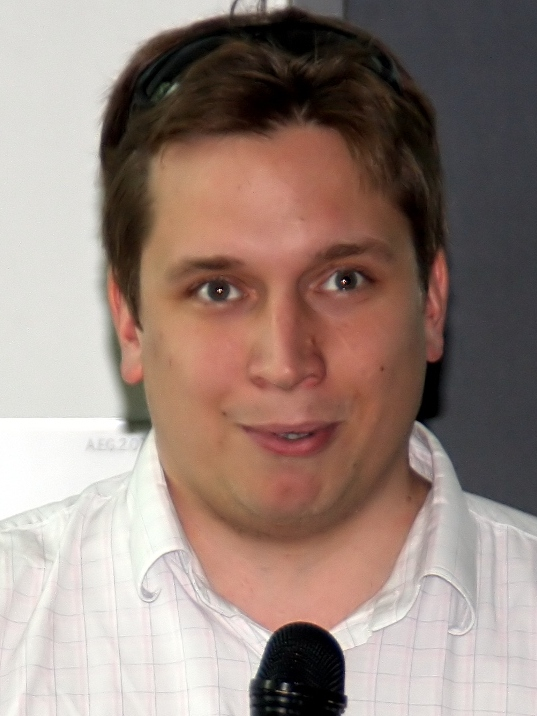
- Coast in 2009
- Born: Stephen Coast; 20 December 1980 (age 45)
- Known for: Founding OpenStreetMap
- Website: stevecoast.com

Stephen Coast (born 20 December 1980) is a British entrepreneur and the founder of the OpenStreetMap community-based world mapping project and CloudMade, a geography-related company.

== Early life ==
Coast grew up in Walderslade, Kent and London, United Kingdom.

== Career ==
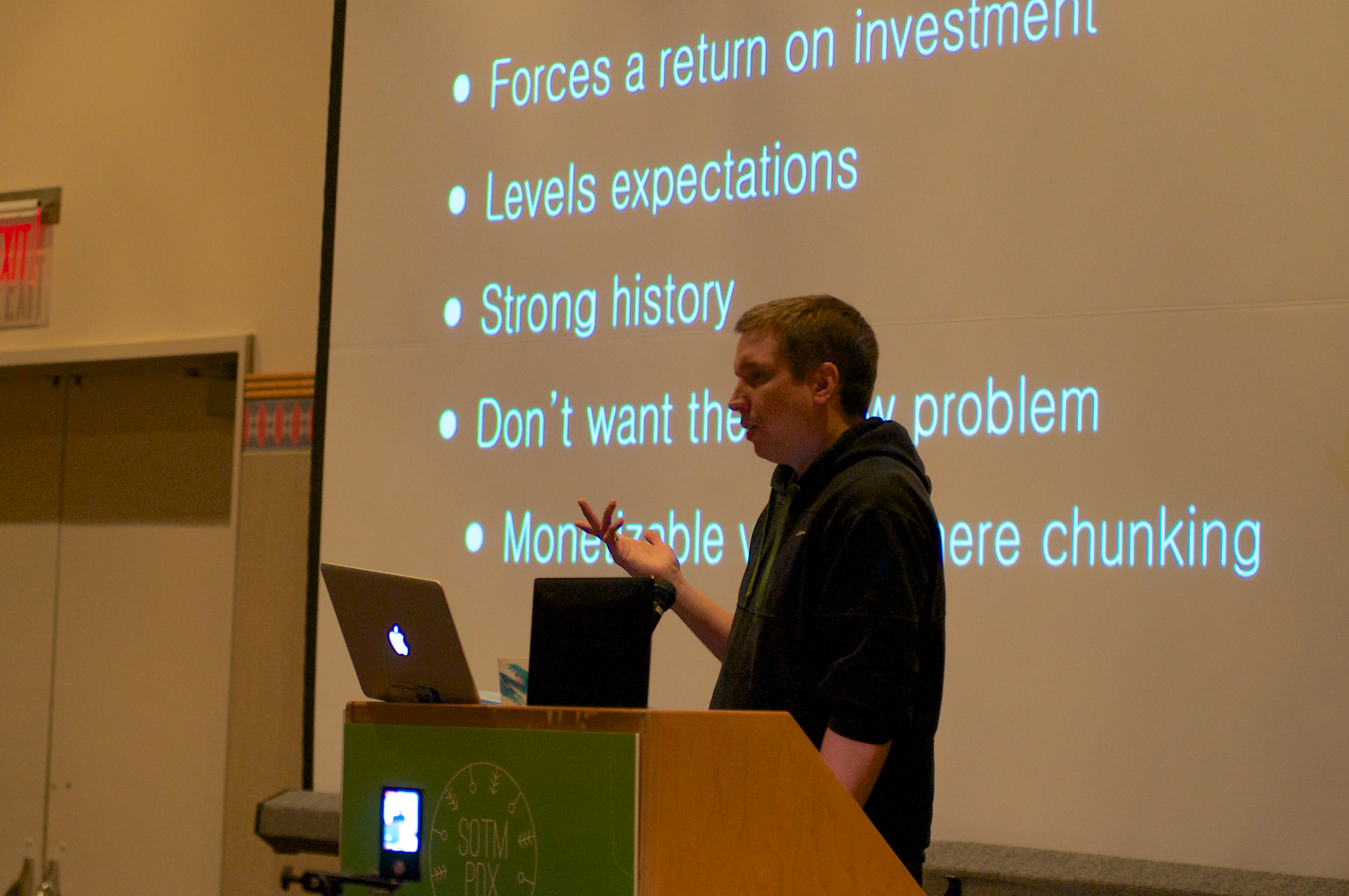
Coast speaking at State of the Map US 2012

Coast was an intern at Wolfram Research before studying computing science at University College London (UCL).

In July 2004, he founded the OpenStreetMap project (OSM).

Coast set up Z.X.V. Ltd. with Nick Black, Tom Carden and Ben Gimpert as a technology consultancy in 2005. In 2008 this became CloudMade after investment by Nikolaj Nyholm and Sunstone Capital (company's website claims it was established in 2007). He resigned from CloudMade in October 2010, although he remained a shareholder.

On 23 November 2010, Coast announced that he had accepted a position as Principal Architect at Microsoft's Bing Mobile.

On 3 September 2013, Coast wrote on his blog that he had started to work for TeleNav, taking care of OSM development for the company's Scout navigator.

In November 2015, Coast published The Book of OSM. The book contains 15 interviews conducted by Coast with various users who had participated in the project since its beginning.

In January 2016, he stepped down from full-time work at TeleNav and became a board advisor for Navmii. In March 2016 he started working as Chief Evangelist for What3words. In May 2016 he became an advisor for MapJam. In October 2017, he joined DigitalGlobe.

In the summer of 2021 he was appointed Vice President of Community at TomTom.

In July 2022, it was announced that Coast had joined Grab as Head of Engineering, Geo Innovation.

== Personal life ==
In 2008, Coast moved to the United States, first to San Francisco. In 2009 he moved to Colorado with his wife Hurricane (born McEwen). In November 2010 Coast wrote that he would be moving to Seattle, Washington. He moved back to Colorado in 2013.
