= StreetComplete =

App for contributing to OpenStreetMap

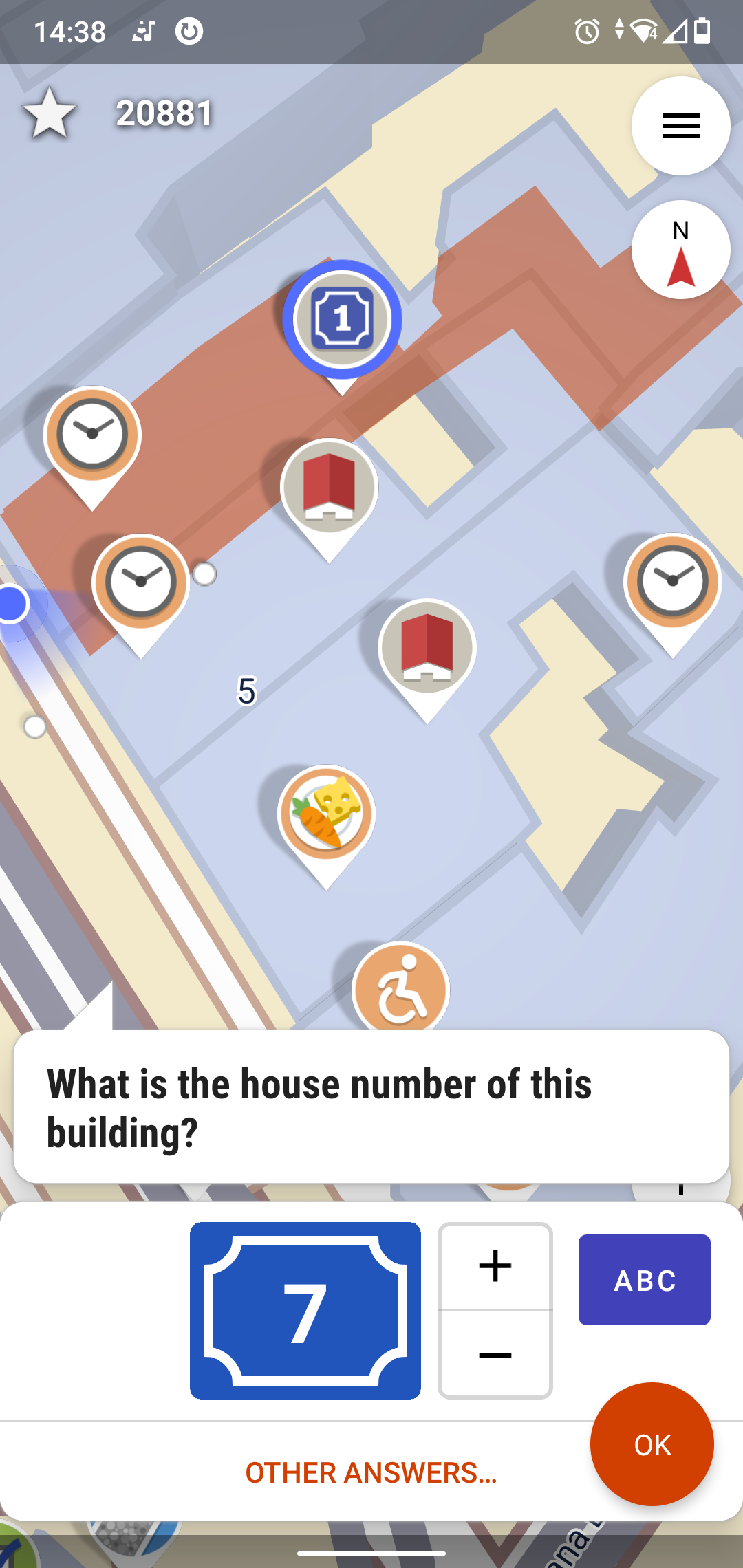
- Original author: Tobias Zwick (westnordost)
- Release: 2017
- Stable release: 64.1 / 1 November 2026; 8 days ago
- Written in: Kotlin
- Platform: Android, iOS
- Type: GIS software
- License: GNU General Public License 3.0
- Website: streetcomplete.app
- Repository: StreetComplete on GitHub

StreetComplete is an OpenStreetMap editor that is designed to be easy to use. The editor can be used without prior knowledge about OpenStreetMap. The app prompts users to answer questions like "What are the opening hours here?" or "Is this still here?" about places and objects in their surrounding. Answering these questions helps to keep the OpenStreetMap database complete and up to date.

== Functionality ==
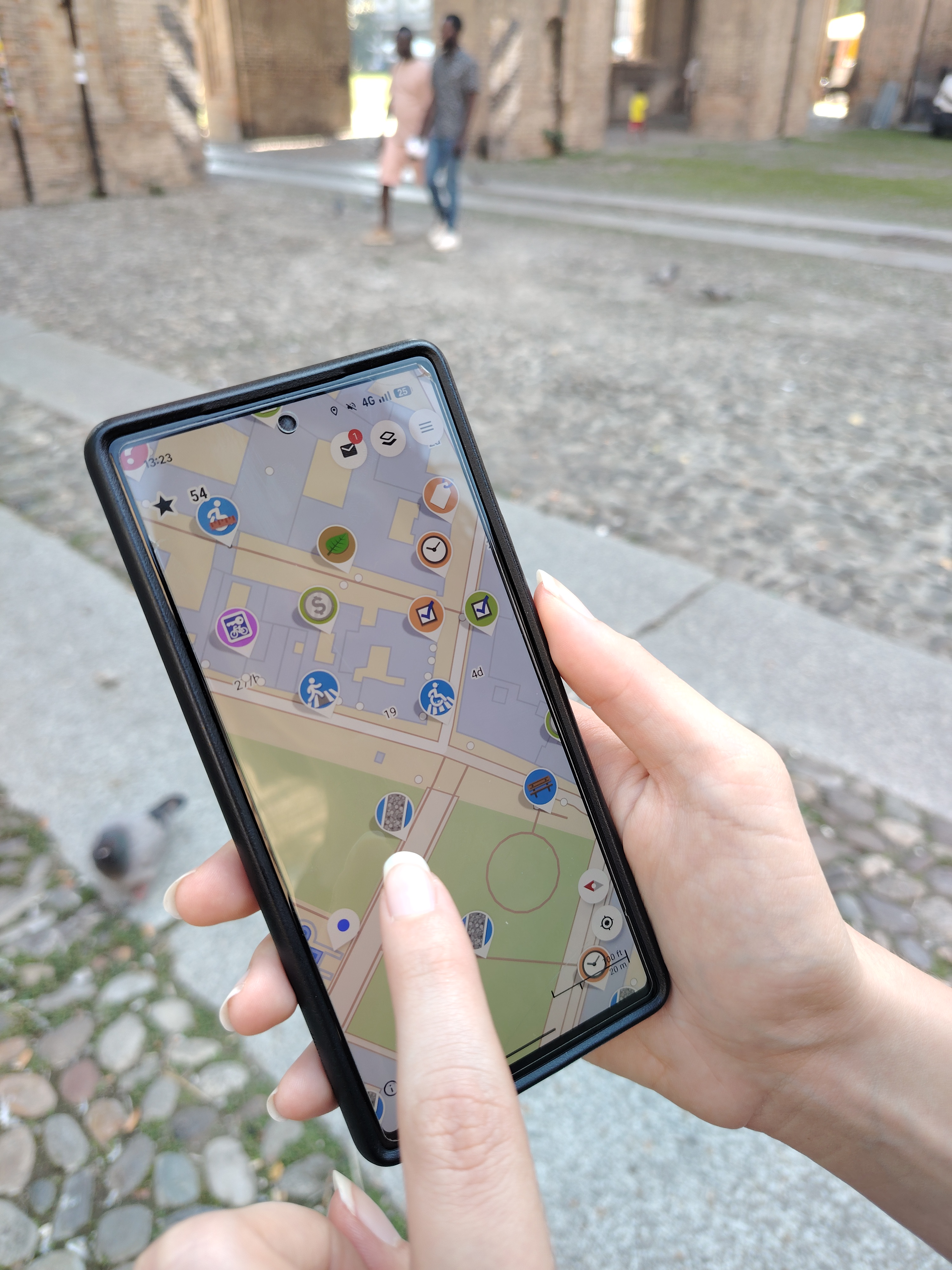
StreetComplete being used at an Italy mapping party.

The app is based on a map view in which places and things with missing or dated OpenStreetMap data are marked. Users can complete this data by answering simple questions (called quests). These quests are designed in such a way that answering them on site is quick and easy and no special expertise or prior knowledge is needed. In case the answer to a quest does not match one of the selection options, other OpenStreetMap contributors can be asked for help by submitting a note.

StreetComplete focuses on adding further details to already existing objects. As a result of this, users can only modify a subset of the data stored in the OpenStreetMap database. It is, e.g., not possible to change the geometry of buildings or roads. For such changes, users must switch to other editors, such as the iD editor.

== Gamification ==
A unique feature of the app compared to other OpenStreetMap editors is the use of gamification. Users are rewarded points for solved quests and can see their national and global rank.

== Usage ==
In the ranking of OpenStreetMap editors, StreetComplete takes second place according to number of users and fourth place according to number of edits. This makes the app the highest-placed smartphone app in both categories.

== Development ==
StreetComplete is an Open Source project licensed under the GNU General Public License 3.0. The source code is published on the project website. An Android app was released in 2017, an iOS version was released in October 2026.
