= Topologically Integrated Geographic Encoding and Referencing =

Data format used by the U.S. Census Bureau

TIGER logo

Topologically Integrated Geographic Encoding and Referencing, known as TIGER or TIGER/Line, is a format used by the United States Census Bureau to describe physical and cultural features, including roads, highways, city limits, rivers, and lakes, as well as areas such as census tracts. The Bureau developed TIGER to support and enhance the process of conducting the Decennial Census. Developed in collaboration with the United States Geological Survey during the 1980s, TIGER became the first nationwide digital map of roads, boundaries, and water. It was initially created for the 1990 Census to modernize the once-a-decade headcount. However, its impact has extended well beyond its initial purpose by providing common map data in electronic form, which supports today's geographic information system industry. TIGER still serves as the basemap for many commercial and open-source map projects in rural areas of the United States. However, commercial mapping companies now provide newer and more detailed mapping data in urban and high-growth areas.

The TIGER files contain only geospatial/map data and do not include census demographic data. GIS can merge census demographics and other data sources with the TIGER files to create maps and conduct analyses. TIGER data is available at no cost because U.S. Government publications must be released into the public domain.

== Coverage ==
The TIGER/Line shapefile data provides complete coverage of the contiguous United States, Alaska, Hawaii, Puerto Rico, the U.S. Virgin Islands, American Samoa, Guam, the Commonwealth of the Northern Mariana Islands, and the Midway Islands.

TIGER includes both land features, such as roads, rivers, and lakes, and political and statistical areas, such as counties, census tracts, and census blocks. It also represents several political areas, including state and federally recognized tribal lands, cities, counties, congressional districts, and school districts. Others are statistical areas, including Metropolitan Statistical Areas (MSAs), census tracts, census block groups, and census blocks. ZIP Code Tabulation Areas (ZCTA) are quasi-statistical areas that aim to approximate, but do not exactly match, the delivery areas of USPS ZIP codes. ZIP codes are based on postal delivery routes and may not correspond to municipalities.

== Future ==
TIGER data published through February 2007 (2006 Second Edition) was in a custom ASCII format officially known as TIGER/Line files. In 2008, the data was published in shapefile format. Shapefiles are not topological, so they may contain sliver polygons when comparing TIGER/Line boundaries with other TIGER features. This mismatch did not occur when the census TIGER/Line files were originally released in ASCII format. Since 2017, the Census Bureau has offered TIGER/Line data as Geodatabases and plans to provide open-source Geopackages starting in 2024. These formats can preserve topological relationships between themes or 'layers'.

Additionally, the Census Bureau has made TIGER data accessible through WMS servers called TIGERweb.
