= Tiled web map =

Map displayed with adjoining small images

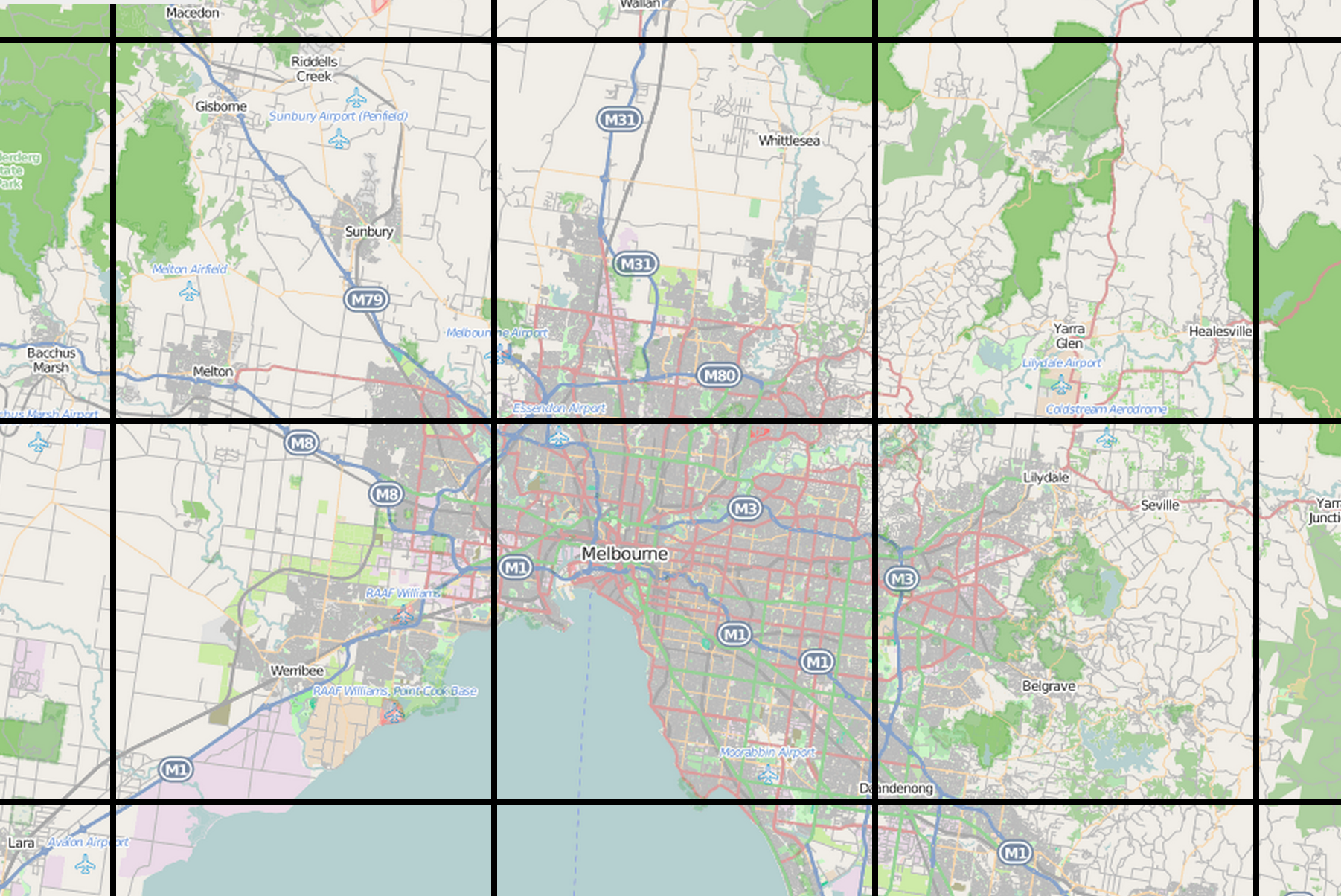
An exaggeration of a tiled web map, in this case the default OpenStreetMap style near Melbourne, Australia. Tiled web maps are normally displayed with no gap between tiles.

A tiled web map or tile map (also known as slippy map in OpenStreetMap), is a web map displayed by seamlessly joining dozens of individually requested data files, called "tiles". It is the most popular way to display and navigate maps, replacing other methods such as Web Map Service (WMS) which typically display a single large image, with arrow buttons to navigate to nearby areas. Google Maps was one of the first major mapping sites to use this technique. The first tiled web maps used raster tiles, before the emergence of vector tiles.

There are several advantages to tiled maps. Each time the user pans, most of the tiles are still relevant, and can be kept displayed, while new tiles are fetched. This greatly improves the user experience, compared to fetching a single map image for the whole viewport. It also allows individual tiles to be pre-computed, a task easy to parallelize. Also, displaying rendered images served from a web server is less computationally demanding than rendering images in the browser, a benefit over technologies such as Web Feature Service (WFS). While many map tiles are in raster format (a bitmap file such as PNG or JPEG), the number of suppliers of vector tiles is growing. Vector tiles are rendered by the client browser, which can thus add a custom style to the map. Vector map tiles may also be rotated separately from any text overlay so that the text remains readable.

== Defining a tiled web map ==
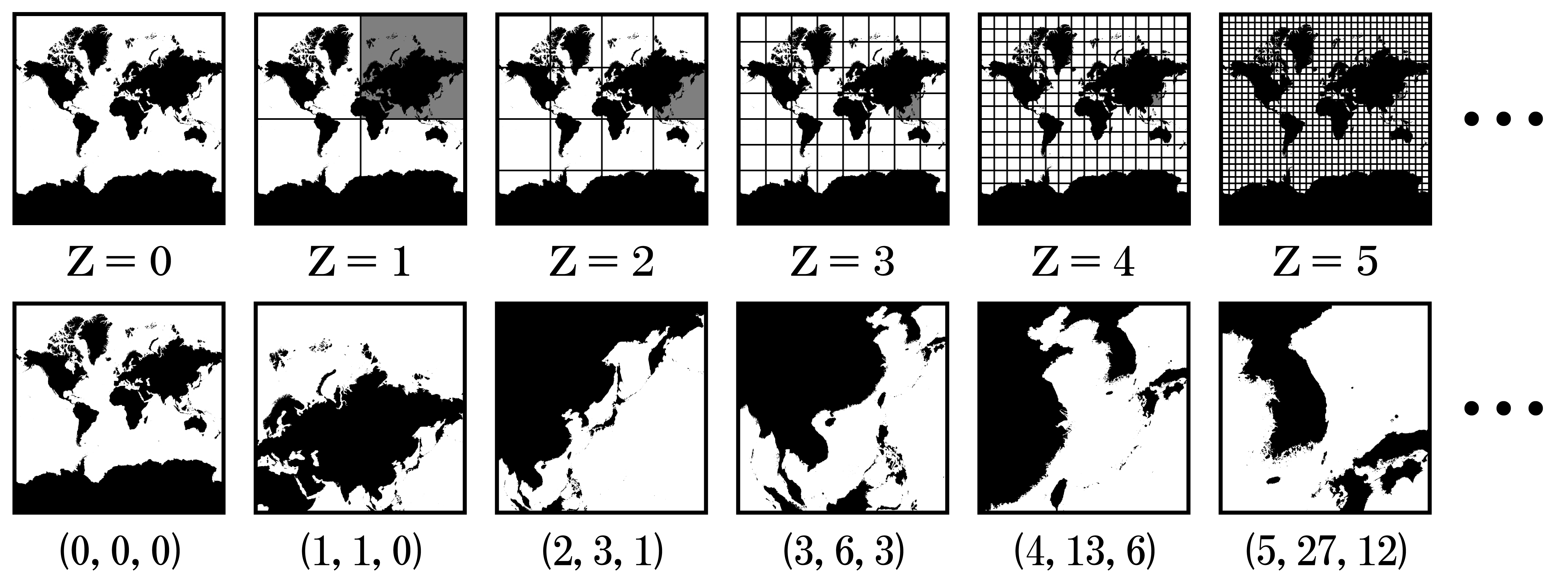
XYZ Tiles coordinate numbers

Properties of tiled web maps that require convention or standards include the size of tiles, the numbering of zoom levels, the projection to use, the way individual tiles are numbered or otherwise identified, and the method for requesting them.

Most tiled web maps follow certain Google Maps conventions:

- Tiles are 256x256 pixels
- At the outer most zoom level, 0, the entire world can be rendered in a single map tile.
- Each zoom level doubles in both dimensions, so a single tile is replaced by 4 tiles when zooming in. This means that about 22 zoom levels are sufficient for most practical purposes.
- The Web Mercator projection is used, with latitude limits of around 85 degrees.

The de facto OpenStreetMap standard, known as Slippy Map Tilenames or XYZ, follows these and adds more:

- An X and Y numbering scheme
- PNG images for tiles
- Images are served through a Web server, with a URL like http://.../Z/X/Y.png, where Z is the zoom level, and X and Y identify the tile.

"One file with all tiles" technology is an alternative with good performance, as demonstrated by PMTiles.

=== Tile numbering schemes ===
There are three main numbering schemes in use:

- Google Maps / OpenStreetMap: (0 to 2^{zoom}-1, 0 to 2^{zoom}-1) for the range (−180, +85.0511) - (+180, −85.0511)
- Tile Map Service: (0 to 2^{zoom}-1, 2^{zoom}-1 to 0) for the range (−180, +85.0511) - (+180, −85.0511). (That is, the same as the previous with the Y value flipped.)
- QuadTrees, used by Microsoft.

== Standards ==
Several standards exist:

- Tile Map Service: an early standard supported by OpenLayers. One difference is the y axis is positive northwards in TMS, and southwards in OpenStreetMap.
- Web Map Tile Service: a more recent Open Geospatial Consortium (OGC) standard.
- The de facto XYZ standard referred to above.
- TileJSON: a lightweight JSON description of all the parameters associated with a web map, created by Mapbox.
- Bing Maps Tile System, using Quadkeys for addressing.

== Client libraries ==
To display a tiled map in a browser usually requires the support of a web mapping framework. This framework handles the retrieval of tiles, display, caching, and user navigation. Popular frameworks for tiled maps include Google Maps API, OpenLayers and Leaflet.
