= Comparison of geographic information systems software =

This is a comparison of notable GIS software. To be included on this list, the software must have a linked existing article.

The selection of GIS software is a non-trivial task typically undertaken at project commencement. The use of appropriate selection criteria and methodology can be critical to a project's success, with considerations including outlay costs, ease of use, data and system harmonization and maintenance, incorporation of advances in technology, and downstream system integration.

== License, source, & operating system support ==
GIS software	Free software	Open source	Windows	Mac OS X	Linux	BSD	Unix	Web	Other
ArcGIS	Viewer(s)	No	Yes	No	No	No	Yes	Yes	Google Earth Plugin, KML, WMS
Autodesk	Viewer(s)	No	Yes	No	Yes	No	No	Yes	No
Cadcorp	Viewer(s)	No	Yes	No	No	No	No	Yes	No
Deegree	Yes	Yes	Java	Java	Java	Java	Java	Yes	No
Erdas Imagine	Viewers & Plug-ins	No	Yes	No	No	No	No	Yes	No
FME	No	No	Yes	Yes	Yes	No	No	FME Cloud	No
GeoBase - Telogis	Trial	No	Yes	No	Yes	Yes	No	Yes	Traffic, WMS, ADAS, Routing
GeoNetwork	Yes	Yes	Java	Java	Java	Java	Java	Yes	No
GeoServer	Yes	Yes	Java	Java	Java	Java	Java	Java	No
GeoTools	Yes	Yes	Java	Java	Java	Java	Java	No	No
GRASS	Yes	Yes	Yes	Yes	Yes	Yes	Yes	via pyWPS	No
gvSIG	Yes	Yes	Java	Java	Java	Java	Java	No	No
IDRISI	No	No	Yes	No	No	No	No	No	No
ILWIS	Yes	Yes	Yes	No	No	No	No	No	No
GeoMedia	Viewer(s)	No	Yes	No	No	No	CLIX	Yes	KML
JUMP GIS	Yes	Yes	Java	Java	Java	Java	Java	No	No
Kosmo	Yes	Yes	Java	Java	Java	Java	Java	No	No
LandSerf	No	No	Java	Java	Java	Java	Java	No	No
MapDotNet	No	No	Yes	No	No	No	No	Yes	
Manifold System	No	No	Yes	No	No	No	No	Yes	No
Microsoft MapPoint	Discontinued	No	Yes	No	No	No	No	Yes	No
Pitney Bowes MapInfo Pro	Viewer(s)	No	Yes	No	No	No	Yes	Yes	No
MapServer	Yes	Yes	Yes	Yes	Yes	Yes	Yes	AMP	No
Maptitude Caliper software	No	No	Yes	No	No	No	No	Yes	No
MapWindow GIS	Yes	Yes	Yes	No	No	No	No	No	No
Oracle Spatial	No	No	Yes	Yes	Yes	No	Yes	Yes	No
PostGIS	Yes	Yes	Yes	Yes	Yes	Yes	Yes	Yes	No
QGIS	Yes	Yes	Yes	Yes	Yes	Yes	Yes	Yes	Google Earth Plugin, KML, WMS
RegioGraph	No	No	Yes	No	No	No	No	No	No
RemoteView	No	No	Yes	No	No	No	No	No	No
SAGA GIS	Yes	Yes	Yes	Yes	Yes	Yes	No	No	KLM
SAP HANA	Free Trial	No	No	No	Yes	No	No	Yes	No
Smallworld	No	Yes	Yes	No	Yes	No	Yes	Read-only	OLE, XML, Multiuser, Utility Data Model, Data Translator export/import
SPRING	Yes	Yes	Yes	No	Yes	No	Solaris	No	No
TerraLib TerraView	Yes	Yes	Yes	No	Yes	No	No	No	No
TNTmips	Viewer(s)	No	Yes	Yes	Yes	No	Yes	No	No
TransModeler Caliper Software	No	No	Yes	No	No	No	No	No	No
uDig	Yes	Yes	Java	Java	Java	Java	Java	No	No

== Pure server ==
=== Map servers ===
Name	Language	WMS	WFS	WFS-T	WCS	WMC	SLD	FES	Other
ArcGIS Server	.NET/Java	Yes	Yes	Yes	Yes	No	Yes	No	SOAP, REST, KML
MapServer	C	Yes	Yes	No	Yes	Yes	Yes	Yes	
Deegree	Java	Yes	Yes	Yes	Yes	No	Yes	Yes	
GeoServer	Java	Yes	Yes	Yes	Yes	Yes	Yes	Yes	
MapDotNet	C#/.NET	Yes	No	No	No	No	No	No	SOAP and REST feature and map services
Manifold System	ASP C#	Yes	Yes	No	No	No	No	No	client and server
GeoMedia WebMap	ASP C#	Yes	Yes	Yes	Yes	No	?	No	

=== Map caches ===
Name	Language	WMS-C	Other
ArcGIS Server	.NET/Java	No	
MapDotNet	C#/.NET	No	File-based and SQL Server

== Pure web client ==
=== Libraries ===
Name	Language	WMS	WFS	GeoRSS	Other
OpenLayers	JavaScript	Yes	Yes	Yes	support for navigation, icons, markers, and layer selection.
Leaflet	JavaScript	Yes	Yes	No	support for navigation, icons, markers, layers, GeoJSON
MapDotNet	JavaScript/HTML5	Yes	Yes	Yes	digitizing, wkt rendering, draggable icons and content, geospatial queries (intersection, overlapping)

== See also ==
- Open Source Geospatial Foundation (OSGeo)
- Geographic information system software
- GIS Live DVD
