= Watershed delineation =

Science and engineering method

Watershed delineation is the process of identifying the boundary of a watershed, also referred to as a catchment, drainage basin, or river basin. It is an important step in many areas of environmental science, engineering, and management, for example to study flooding, aquatic habitat, or water pollution.

The activity of watershed delineation is typically performed by geographers, scientists, and engineers. Historically, watershed delineation was done by hand on paper topographic maps, sometimes supplemented with field research. In the 1980s, automated methods were developed for watershed delineation with computers and electronic data, and these are now in widespread use.

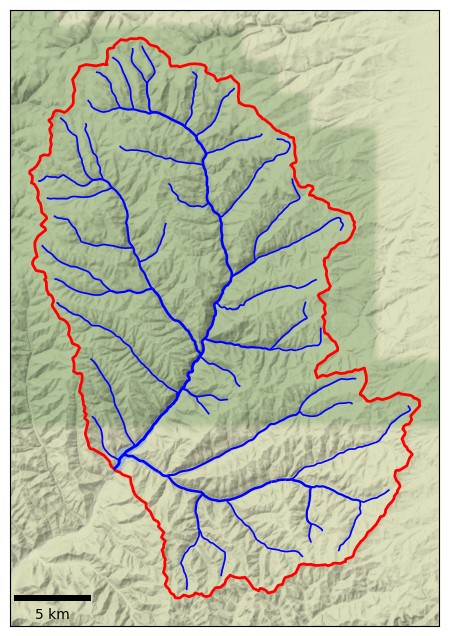
Map of the watershed of the Lost Creek Reservoir in Morgan County, Utah, United States, showing the major streams in blue and the watershed boundary in red.

Computerized methods for watershed delineation use digital elevation models (DEMs), datasets that represent the height of the Earth's land surface. Computerized watershed delineation may be done using specialized hydrologic modeling software such as WMS, geographic information system software like ArcGIS or QGIS, or with programming languages like Python or R.

Watersheds are a fundamental geographic unit in hydrology, the science concerned with the movement, distribution, and management of water on Earth. Delineating watersheds may be considered an application of hydrography, the branch of applied sciences which deals with the measurement and description of the physical features of oceans, seas, coastal areas, lakes and rivers. It is also related to geomorphometry, the quantitative science of analyzing land surfaces. Watershed delineation continues to be an active area of research, with scientists and programmers developing new algorithms and methods, and making use of increasingly high-resolution data from aerial or satellite remote sensing.

== Manual watershed delineation ==
The conventional method of finding a watershed boundary is to draw it by hand on a paper topographic map, or on a transparent overlay. The watershed area can then be estimated using a planimeter, by overlaying graph paper and counting grid cells, or the result can be digitized for use with mapping software. The same process can be done on a computer, sketching the watershed boundary (with a mouse or stylus) over a digital copy of a topographic map. This is referred to as "heads up digitizing" or "on-screen digitizing."

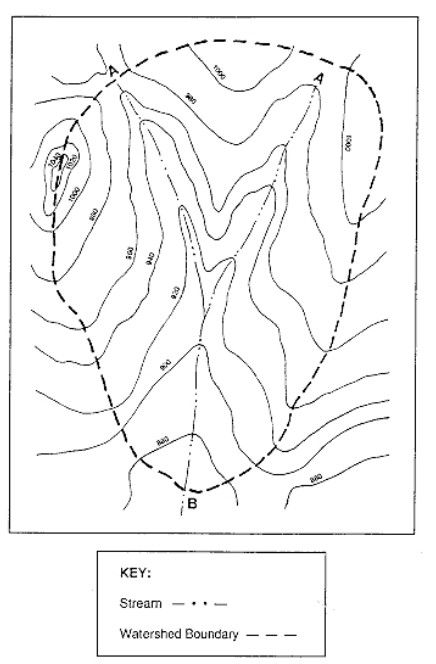
Example of an idealized watershed boundary, drawn on a topographic map with elevation contours. Any precipitation that falls inside the watershed boundary will flow toward the watershed outlet at the bottom.

For "manual" watershed delination, one must know how to read and interpret a topographic map, for example to identify ridges, valleys, and the direction of steepest slope. Even in the computer era, manual watershed delineation is still a useful skill, in order to check whether watersheds generated with software are correct.

Instructions for manual watershed delineation can be found in some textbooks in geography or environmental management, in government pamphlets, or in online video tutorials.

According to the US Geological Survey, there are 5 steps to manual watershed delineation:

1. Find the point of interest along a stream on the map. This is the "watershed outlet" or "pour point."
2. Imagine or draw surface water flow lines that point downhill perpendicular to the topographic contours (this is the steepest direction).
3. Mark the location of topographical high points (peaks) around the stream.
4. Mark the points along contours that divide flows towards or away from the stream (ridges).
5. Connect the dots to delineate the watershed.

General Rules:

- The watershed boundary should be perpendicular to contour lines where it crosses them.
- The watershed boundary must not cross rivers or streams other than at the outlet. (In some cases, a blue line representing a man-made canal or pipeline may traverse your watershed boundary.)
- The watershed boundary should run along ridgelines and connect high points.

One disadvantage to manual watershed delineation is that it is subject to errors and the individual judgment of the analyst. The Illinois Environmental Protection Agency wrote, "bear in mind that delineating a watershed is an inexact science. Any two people, even if both are experts, will come up with slightly different boundaries."

Especially for smaller watersheds and when accurate results are important, field reconnaissance may be needed to find features that are not shown on maps. "Going out into the field allows you to identify human alterations, such as road ditches, storm sewers and culverts that could change the direction of waters flow and thus change the watershed boundaries."

== Automated or computerized watershed delineation ==
Using computer software to delineate watersheds can be much faster than manual methods. It may also be more consistent, as it removes analyst's subjectivity. Automatic methods of watershed delineation have been in use since the 1980s, and are now in widespread use in the science and engineering communities. Researchers have even used computer methods to delineate watersheds on Mars.

Automated watershed delineation methods use digital data of the earth's elevation, a Digital Elevation Model, or DEM. Typically, algorithms use the method of "steepest slope" to calculate the flow direction from a grid cell (or pixel) to one of its neighbors.

It is possible to use DEMs in different formats for watershed delineation, such as a Triangular Irregular Network (TIN), or Hexagonal tiling however most contemporary algorithms make use of a regular rectangular grid. In the 1980s and 1990s, digital elevation models were often obtained by scanning and digitizing the contours on paper topographic maps, which were then converted to a TIN or a gridded DEM. More recently, the DEM is obtained by aerial or satellite remote sensing, using stereophotogrammetry, lidar, or radar.

To use a rectangular grid DEM for watershed delineation, it must first be processed or "conditioned" in order to return realistic results. The result is sometimes referred to as a "hydro-enforced" DEM or a "HydroDEM." Most of the software packages listed below can perform these functions on a "raw" DEM, or analysts can download hydrologically-conditioned DEMs such as the near-global HydroSHEDS, MERIT-Hydro, or EDNA for the continental United States. The usual steps for hydrologic conditioning of a DEM are:

1. Fill sinks.
2. "Burn in" the stream channels.
3. Calculate flow direction.
4. Calculate flow accumulation.

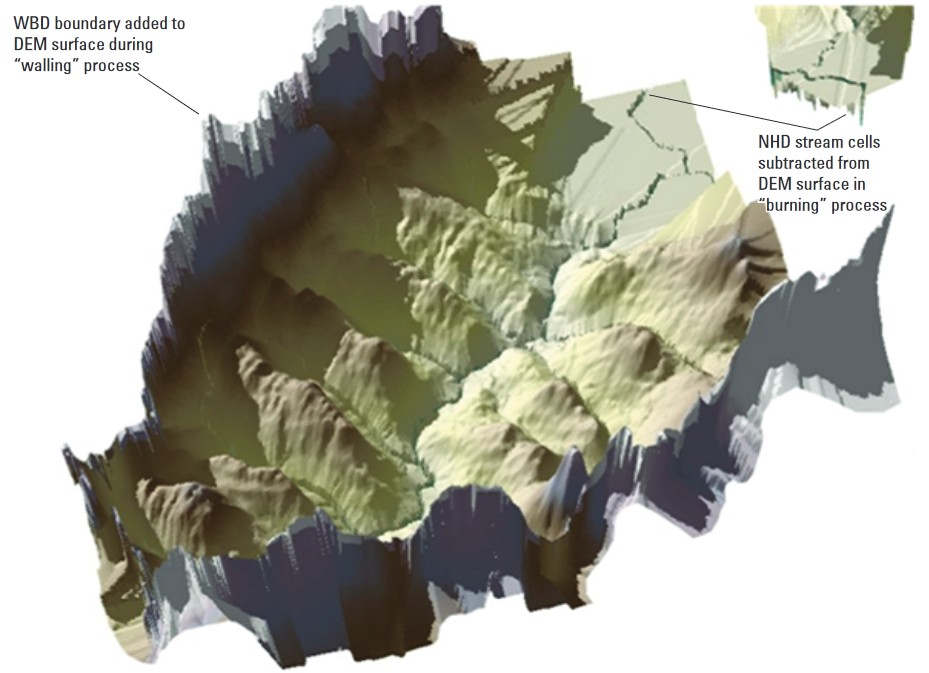
3D rendering of a hydrologically-conditioned digital elevation model. This example from the U.S. Geological Survey shows "walling" or "fencing" using data from the Watershed Boundary Dataset (WBD) and "burning" of streams from the National Hydrography Dataset (NHDPlus).

Additionally, some methods allow for "fencing ridgelines" and burning in flow pathways through lakes. Some methods also enforce a small slope onto flat areas so that flow will continue to move toward the outlet. The step of "burning in" stream channels involves artificially deepening the channel, by subtracting a large elevation value from pixels that represent the channel. This ensures that once flow has entered the channel, it will stay there rather than jumping out and flowing overland or into another channel. Some algorithms infer the location of channels automatically from the DEM. Better results are usually obtained by burning in mapped stream channels, or channels derived from satellite or aerial imagery.

There are several different algorithms available for calculating flow direction from a DEM. The first method, introduced by Australian geographers O'Callaghan and Mark in 1984, is referred to as D8. Water flows from a pixel to one of 8 possible directions to a neighboring cell (including diagonally), based on the direction of steepest slope. There are disadvantages to this method as water flow is limited to 8 directions, separated by 45°, which may result in unrealistic flow patterns. Also, because all of the flow is routed in one direction, the D8 method is unable to model situations where the flow diverges, such as on convex hillsides, in a river delta, or in branched or braided rivers. Alternative algorithms have been proposed and implemented to overcome this limitation, such as D∞. Nevertheless, the D8 algorithm remains in widespread use, and has been used to create important datasets such as HydroBasins and MERIT-Basins.

Computerized watershed delineation is not always correct. Some errors stem from incorrectly placing the watershed outlet on the digital river network, or "snapping the pour point." Another class of errors stems from inaccuracies in the digital terrain data, or where its resolution is too coarse to capture flow pathways. In general, DEMs with higher spatial resolution can more realistically describe topography of the land surface and flow direction. However, there is a tradeoff, as a finer grid with more pixels increases computing time. Nevertheless, even high-resolution data may not adequately capture flow pathways in complex environments like cities and suburbs, where flow is directed by curbs, culverts, and storm drains. Finally, some errors can result from the algorithm or the choice of parameters.

Because errors are common, some authorities insist that the results of automated delineation must be carefully checked. The US Geological Survey's standards for the US Watershed Boundary Dataset allow the use of software "to generate intermediate or "draft" boundary lines," which then must be verified by the analyst by overlaying them on a computer display over basemaps (scanned topographic maps, aerial photographs) to verify their accuracy.

== Software for watershed delineation ==
Some of the first watershed delineation software was written in FORTRAN, such as CATCH and DEDNM. Watershed delineation tools are a part of several Geographic Information System software packages such as ArcGIS, QGIS, and GRASS GIS. There are standalone programs for watershed delineation such as TauDEM. Watershed delineation tools are also incorporated into some hydrologic modeling software packages.

Software developers have also published libraries or modules in several languages (see list below). Many of these packages are free and open source, which means they can be expanded or adapted by those willing and able to write or modify code. Finally, there are web applications for delineating watersheds. Some of these web apps have extra features for science and engineering like calculating flow statistics or watershed land cover types (e.g.: StreamStats, Model My Watershed).

=== Standalone watershed delineation software ===
- TauDEM, Toolbox for ArcGIS, or command line executable for Windows.
- TOPAZ, from the US Department of Agriculture, Windows executable.

=== Hydrologic Modeling Software with Watershed Delineation Capability ===
- WMS (hydrology software)
- SWAT model
- BASINS
- BasinMaker, for use with the RAVEN software suite, for parts of US and Canada only
- WEAP Model

=== GIS-based software ===
- ESRI ArcGIS or the ArcGIS online web application
- GRASS GIS, modules r.water, r.watershed, and r.stream
- QGIS
- SAGA GIS
- Whitebox Geospatial Analysis Tools
- ILWIS
- TerrSet (formerly IDRISI)
- TNTmips
- MapWindow GIS
- Manifold System
- Blue Marble Geographics § Global Mapper

=== Web Applications ===
- Global Watersheds, web app and API
- Stream Stats, from the US Geological Survey, allows you to delineate watersheds in the US only
- Model My Watershed, by the Stroud Water Research Center, US only, can delineate watersheds based on an outlet point, and perform analyses related to water quality
- Ontario Watershed Information Tool, for the province of Ontario in Canada

== Vector datasets of pre-delineated watersheds ==
There are a number of vector datasets representing watersheds as polygons that can be displayed and analyzed with GIS or other software. In these datasets, the entire land surface is divided into "subwatersheds" or "unit catchments." Individual unit watersheds can be combined or merged to find larger watersheds. The unit catchments have linked hydrological code data or similar metadata to create a flow network, so flow pathways and connections can be determined via network analysis.

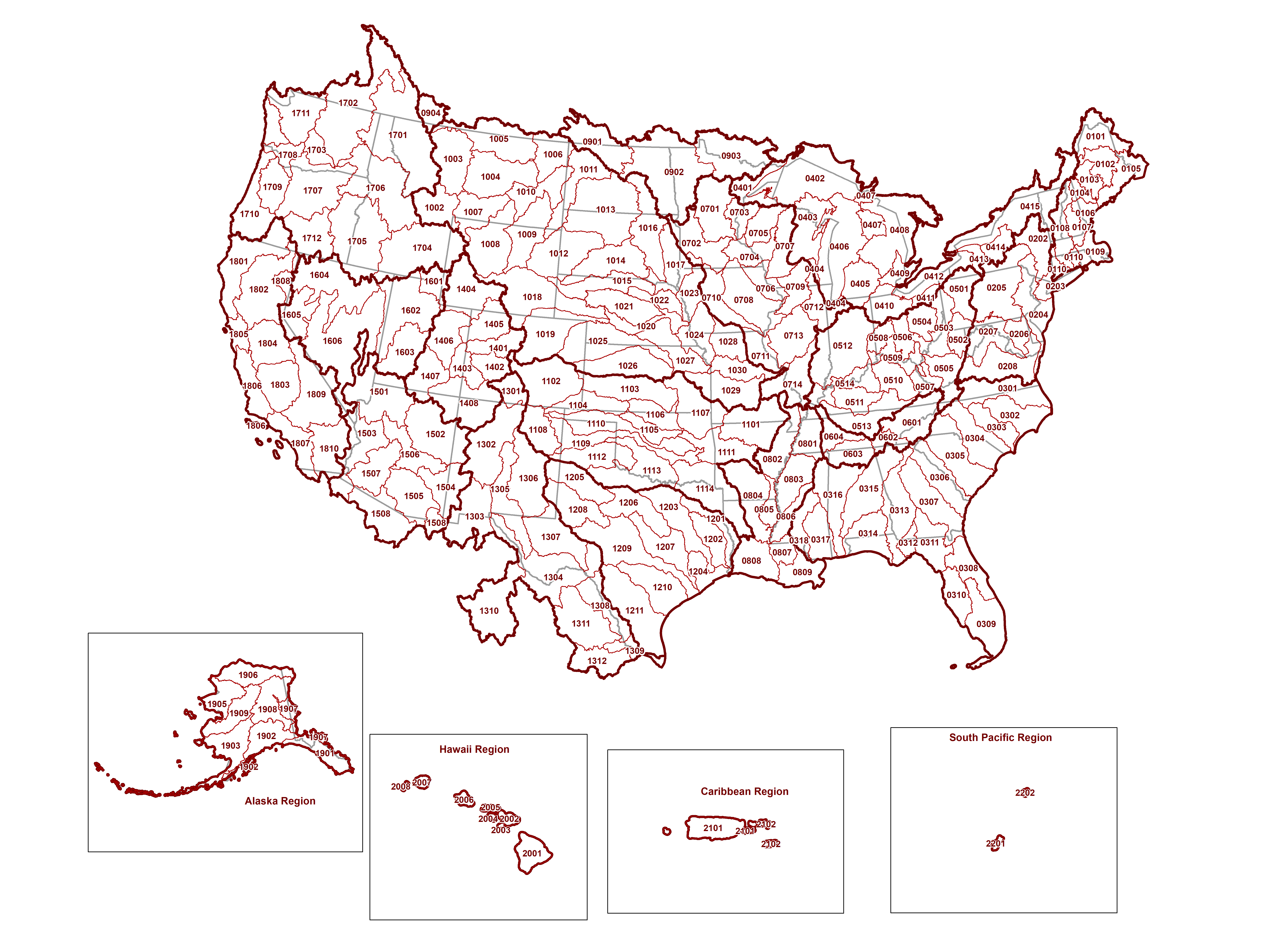
Watershed Boundary Dataset Subregions Map for the United States, created by the US Geological Survey

This list is non-exhaustive, as many organizations and territories have produced their own watershed map data and have published via the web. Notable datasets include:

- United States Watershed Boundary Dataset, website (continually updated)
- Canadian National Hydrographic Network Watershed Boundaries, website
- HydroBasins website (global, 2013)
- Hydrologic Derivatives for Modeling and Applications (HDMA), (global, 2017)
- MERIT-Basins, website (global, 2021)
- Hydrography90m, website (2022, global, shows smaller headwater streams)
