= List of spatial analysis software =

Spatial analysis software is software written to enable and facilitate spatial analysis. It comprises a broad class of tools designed to store, manipulate, visualize, and interpret data with a geographic or spatial component. These applications support tasks such as geostatistics, spacial modeling, network analysis, and raster-vector processing, enabling researchers and practitioners to derive meaningful patterns and relationships from location-based information.

Currently, there are several software packages, ranging from fully open-source projects to proprietary software, which address different layers of the spatial data infrastructure stack.

== Packages ==
Package	Free of charge	Operating Systems	Developer institution/person	Field of interest (if any specific)	Main Features	Language	License
Snappy Mapper	Yes, for non-commercial use	Web-based	Snappy Mapper	Vector data	Bridges the knowledge gap between users and GIS entities, allowing data generation and sharing by non-technical users		Proprietary (with free trial available).
CARTO	No	Web-based (Cloud SaaS)	CARTO	Spatial data science & location intelligence	Spatial SQL, spatial data science, location analytics, site selection, data visualization, mapping, geocoding and app development. Access to a catalog of 1,000s of spatial datasets.		Proprietary (with free trial available).
Fract	No	Linux, Windows, Unix, iOS, Android, Windows Phone, Cloud	Fract, Inc.	Geospatial AI Analytics for Business Intelligence	Ease of use, AI feedback, Territory Mapping		Proprietary
Mapcite	Yes for Excel addin	Linux, Windows, Unix, iOS, Android, Windows Phone	Mapcite Ltd - London and Sydney	Geospatial data analytics, location data sets, geocoding	Ease of aggregation and harmonisation of disparate data sets to expose insights and create new data.		Proprietary
360FranTerra 20/20iSite MarketMentor	No		GbBIS	Custom web applications used for a range of spatial analysis including franchise territory design and management, location analysis and site selection, market analysis and more.			
LuciadLightspeed	No	Linux, Windows, Unix, iOS, Android, Windows Phone	Luciad	LuciadLightspeed is widely recognized as the leading set of high-performance geospatial software components.	LuciadLightspeed consists of over 100 different software components and connectors to fuse, visualize and analyze geospatial data. This can include static and moving data, maps, satellite imagery, crowd-sourced data, full motion video, weather data and terrain elevation in many different geodetic references and map projections. Geo-fencing, line-of-sight calculations, geo-triggered events, dynamic and complex route calculations and automated anomaly detection are just a mouse click away. Independent benchmark tests by academia and industry leave no doubt: LuciadLightspeed is over 100 times faster and more accurate than traditional GIS software.	Web API, Java-J2EE, .NET, JavaScript, HTML5	Proprietary.
Polaris Intelligence	No	Linux, Windows, Unix, iOS, Android, Windows Phone	Polaris Intelligence	Geospatial data analytics, business intelligence	Easy to use. Polaris Intelligence consists of multiple modules including mapping (thematic maps, heat maps, POI maps, trade area maps), customer profiling, gravity models, customer allocation models, feature selection, data mining, and targeting. A key strength is the vast quantities of consumer geo-demographic and behaviour data native to the platform.		
ArcGIS	No	Linux, Windows, Unix, iOS, Android, Windows Phone	Esri	A GIS system to create, visualize, manage, and analyze spatial data. Supports desktop, web, and mobile applications.	In addition to spatial data editing and visualization, ArcGIS provides spatial analysis and modeling features including overlay, surface, proximity, suitability, and network analysis, as well as interpolation analysis and other geostatistical modeling techniques.	Python, Web API, .NET	Proprietary. Analytical extensions can be purchased separately.
ClusterPy (non-GUI, open source); GeoGrouper (GUI, free)	yes	Linux, MAC OS, Windows	RiSE group, Dr. Juan C. Duque and Boris Dev	Spatial clustering	Library of algorithms to aggregate areas into regions, where each region is geographically connected, while optimizing a predefined objective function.	Python	BSD license
R-Analysis of Spatial Data	yes	Linux, MAC OS, Windows	Roger Bivand (maintainer)	Analysis	Full integration of spatial data analysis tools with the R: classes for spatial data; handling spatial data; reading and writing spatial data; point pattern analysis; geostatistics; disease mapping and areal data analysis; spatial regression and ecological analysis.	R	GPL-2
Google Earth	yes	Linux, MAC OS, Windows	Google	3D visualisation	Easy to use, dynamic graphics, historical maps, users can create dynamic "tours," integrated with the Web.	-	Freeware
PySAL	yes	Linux, MAC OS, Windows	GeoDa Center	Analysis	Modules for: computational geometry, spatial weights, ESDA, inequality, mobility and spatial econometrics	Python	BSD license
Minerva	yes	Linux, MAC OS, Windows	Arizona State University	Minerva Project Visualization (3D)	High performance; ability to display large amounts of raster and vector from multiple sources	C++	BSD license
GMap Creator	yes	Linux, MAC OS, Windows	CASA	CASA website for GMap Creator, Web Mapping	Thematic mapping. Creates image pictures from shapefiles and creates Google Maps websites with the data linked to the shapefile	-	Freeware
QGIS	yes	Linux, MAC OS, Windows	QGIS Development Team	Visualization	Easy to use, ability to expand functionality with Python plugins. Geo-processing functions included.	C++	GPL
GRASS	yes	Linux, MAC OS, Windows	GRASS Development Team	GIS	Extensive set of GIS tools for both raster and vector data, SQL, visualization, voxel	C, C++, Python, Tcl	GPL
GeoDa	yes	Windows, MAC OS, Linux	Center for Spatial Data Science, University of Chicago	Analysis	Interactive exploratory spatial data analysis, dynamic linking and brushing for cross-section data, local cluster stats, basic spatial regression capabilities.	C++	GPL
STARS	yes	Linux, MAC OS, Windows	GeoDa Center	Analysis	ESTDA (Exploratory Space-Time Data Analysis). Interactive linking, brushing and travelling for space-time data	Python	GPL
GeoDaSpace	yes	MAC OS, Windows	Center for Spatial Data Science, University of Chicago	Spatial Econometrics	Advanced spatial models for cross section (GMM, IV and spatial HAC)	Python	Freeware
SANET	yes	Windows	Atsu Okabe	Point patterns in networks	Analysis of events that occur on networks or alongside networks. Includes 14 tools for point patterns in networks	-	Freeware
CrimeStat	yes	Windows	Ned Levine and Associates	Spatial analysis of points, zones, and lines	Basic spatial description, hot spot analysis, kernel density interpolation, space-time interaction, journey-to-crime analysis (Geographic profiling), crime travel demand modelling, and spatial regression.	-	Freeware
SaTScan	yes	Windows, Linux, MAC OS	Martin Kulldorff and Information Management Services Inc.	Applications by Field of Study	Spatial, temporal and Space-Time Scan Statistics	C/C++, Java	Freeware
Croizat	yes	Linux, MAC OS, Windows	Mauro J. Cavalcanti	Panbiogeography	Ability to integrate and analyze spatial data on species or other taxa and to explore geographical patterns in diversity under a panbiogeographic and graph-theoretic approach	Python	GPL
Hawths Tools	yes (Requires ArcGIS, which is not free)	Windows	Hawthorne Beyer	Ecology	Analysis, sampling, animal movements, kernel, raster, table, vector editing, specialist and other tools.		Freeware
Fragstats	yes	Windows	Dr. Kevin McGarigal - University of Massachusetts	Landscape metrics for categorical map patterns	Area, density, edge metrics. Shape metrics (Fractal dimension index) and much more.	Visual C++	Freeware
Patch Analyst	yes	Windows	Rob Rempel - Centre for Northern Forest Ecosystems Research	Patch metrics for categorical map patterns	Mean patch size, Number of patches, Indices of patchiness, edge metrics, and much more.	Visual C++	Freeware
SAGA	yes	Windows, Linux	Institute of Geography at the University of Hamburg, Germany	GIS, Analysis	Grid analysis, Geostatistics, Terrain Analysis, Hydrology simulation, TIN tools.	C++	OpenSource
Whitebox GAT	yes	Linux, MAC OS, Windows	John Lindsay - Centre for Hydrogeomatics, University of Guelph, Canada	GIS and remote sensing package	GIS analysis, hydrological tools, image processing tools, LiDAR tools, statistical analysis, stream network analysis, terrain analysis	.NET framework 3.5	GPL
ILWIS Open	yes	Windows	Remote sensing and GIS software which integrates image, vector and thematic data.		Integrated raster and vector design; import and export of widely used data formats; on-screen and tablet digitizing; image processing tools; orthophoto, image geo-referencing, transformation and mosaicing; Advanced modelling and spatial data analysis; 3D visualization; projection and coordinate system library; geo-statistical analyses; production and visualization of stereo image pairs; spatial Multiple Criteria Evaluation; WMS; Surface Energy Balances.	-	GPL
Map Comparison Kit (MCK)	yes	Windows	Map comparisons for categorical and numerical maps.		A large number of map comparison algorithms for categorical and numerical maps, including Kappa, variations to Kappa, and landscape metrics.	C++	Freeware
IDRISI	No	Windows	Clark Labs	GIS, Image Processing, Spatial Modelling	A GIS analysis package for basic and advanced spatial analysis, an Image Processing system with extensive hard and soft classifiers including machine learning classifiers, integrated modelling environments including the Earth Trends Modeller for image time series of environmental trends and Land Change Modeller for land change analysis and prediction.	Delphi	Proprietary
Biodiverse	Yes	Linux, Windows, Unix, macOS	Shawn Laffan	Biogeography, Biodiversity, Environmental	Biodiverse is a tool for the spatial analysis of diversity using indices based on taxonomic, phylogenetic and matrix-based (e.g. genetic distance) relationships, as well as related environmental variations. Biodiverse supports: linked visualisation of data in geographic, taxonomic, phylogenetic and matrix spaces; Spatial moving window analyses; Spatially constrained agglomerative cluster and region grower analyses; and Randomisations for hypothesis testing.	Perl	LGPL
ERDAS IMAGINE	No	Windows	Intergraph	Remote Sensing, Image Processing, Spatial Modelling, GIS	ERDAS IMAGINE incorporates geospatial image processing and analysis, remote sensing, and GIS capabilities into a single powerful, convenient package. ERDAS IMAGINE enables users to easily create value-added products such as 2D and 3D images, 3D fly-through movies, and cartographic-quality map compositions from geospatial data.	C, C++	Proprietary
TerraLens	No	Linux, Windows, Unix, MacOS, Android, Windows Phone	Kongsberg Geospatial	TerraLens is a real-time computing geospatial software platform optimized for mission-critical applications and performance on low-end hardware and chipsets.	TerraLens is a geospatial platform that includes a comprehensive core API, as well as additional tools like a Web Map Tile Service (WMTS) tile server, a map styling and packaging tool, and a UI development middleware toolkit. TerraLens is designed to easily fuse and integrate a wide range of real-time data sources, including SONAR, RADAR, and LIDAR data, full-motion video, and proprietary or open-source data that includes geolocation elements with terrain elevation and satellite imagery in a wide range of formats and map projections. TerraLens is used extensively for real-time applications including naval and air defence, beyond visual line-of-sight (BVLOS) mission management for unmanned systems, and air traffic management.	C++, Java-J2EE, .NET, QT (software), Web GL	Proprietary
GIS Spatial Analytics & Analysis	No	Web-based	Marketing Systems Group	Spatial analysis and data visualization for an array of business and government sectors	Leverage the power of geographic and demographic data using MSG’s full suite of GIS services: reports and maps, geocoding, spatial analytics, geographic frame design and much more. From simple maps and reports to multifaceted data, spatial projects, and custom consulting, MSG’s GIS group has you covered.	-	Proprietary

== See also ==
- Comparison of GIS software
- GIS
- Spatial analysis
- Spatial network analysis software
