= Geomorphometry =

Analysis of terrain

Geomorphometry, or geomorphometrics (Ancient Greek: γῆ, romanized: gê, lit. 'earth' + Ancient Greek: μορφή, romanized: morphḗ, lit. 'form, shape' + Ancient Greek: μέτρον, romanized: métron, lit. 'measure'), is the science and practice of measuring the characteristics of terrain, the shape of the surface of the Earth, and the effects of this surface form on human and natural geography. It gathers various mathematical, statistical and image processing techniques that can be used to quantify morphological, hydrological, ecological and other aspects of a land surface. Common synonyms for geomorphometry are geomorphological analysis (after geomorphology), terrain morphometry, terrain analysis, and land surface analysis. Geomorphometrics is the discipline based on the computational measures of the geometry, topography and shape of the Earth's horizons, and their temporal change. This is a major component of geographic information systems (GIS) and other software tools for spatial analysis.

In simple terms, geomorphometry aims at extracting (land) surface parameters (morphometric, hydrological, climatic, etc.) and objects (watersheds, stream networks, landforms, etc.) using input digital land surface model (also known as digital elevation model, DEM) and parameterization software. Extracted surface parameters and objects can then be used, for example, to improve mapping and modeling of soils, vegetation, land use, geomorphological and geological features and similar.

With the rapid increase of sources of DEMs today (and mainly due to the Shuttle Radar Topography Mission and LIDAR-based projects), extraction of land surface parameters is becoming more and more attractive to numerous fields ranging from precision agriculture, soil-landscape modeling, climatic and hydrological applications to urban planning, education, and space research. The topography of almost all Earth has been sampled or scanned today so that DEMs are available at resolutions of 100 m or better at a global scale. Today, land surface parameters are successfully used for both stochastic and process-based modeling, the only remaining issue being the level of detail and vertical accuracy of the DEM.

== History ==
Although geomorphometry started with the ideas of Brisson (1808) and Gauss (1827), the field did not evolve much until the development of GIS and DEM datasets in the 1970s.

Geomorphology (which focuses on the processes that modify the land surface) has a long history as a concept and area of study, with geomorphometry being one of the oldest related disciplines. Geomatics is a more recently evolved sub-discipline, and even more recent is the concept of geomorphometrics. This has only recently been developed since the availability of more flexible and capable geographic information system (GIS) software, as well as higher resolution Digital Elevation Model (DEM). It is a response to the development of this GIS technology to gather and process DEM data (e.g. remote sensing, the Landsat program and photogrammetry). Recent applications proceed with the integration of geomorphometry with digital image analysis variables obtained by aerial and satellite remote sensing. As the triangulated irregular network (TIN) arose as an alternative model for representing the terrain surface, corresponding algorithms were developed for deriving measurements from it.

== Surface gradient (derivatives) ==
Various basic measurements can be derived from the terrain surface, generally applying the techniques of vector calculus. That said, the algorithms typically used in GIS and other software use approximate calculations that produce similar results in much less time with discrete datasets than the pure continuous function methods. Many strategies and algorithms have been developed, each having advantages and disadvantages.

=== Surface normal and gradient ===
A surface with a sample of normal vectors

The surface normal at any point on the terrain surface is a vector ray that is perpendicular to the surface. The surface gradient ($\nabla f$) is the vector ray that is tangent to the surface, in the direction of steepest downhill slope.

=== Slope ===
The geometry of calculating slope

Slope or grade measures how steep the terrain is at any point on the surface, deviating from a horizontal surface. In principle, it is the angle between the gradient vector and the horizontal plane, given either as an angular measure α (common in scientific applications) or as the ratio $p = \frac{rise}{run}$, commonly expressed as a percentage, such that p = tan α. The latter is frequently used in engineering applications like road and railway construction.

Deriving slope from a raster digital elevation model requires calculating a discrete approximation of the surface derivative based on the elevation of a cell and those of its surrounding cells, and several methods have been developed. For example, the Horne method, implemented in ArcGIS, uses the elevation of a cell and its eight immediate neighbors, spaced by the cell size or resolution r:

e_{NW}	e_{N}	e_{NE}
e_{W}	e_{0}	e_{E}
e_{SW}	e_{S}	e_{SE}

The partial derivatives are then approximated as weighted averages of the differences between the opposing sides:

$$\frac{\partial z}{\partial x} \approx \frac{e_{NE} + 2e_{E} + e_{SE} - e_{NW} - 2e_{W} - e_{SW}}{8r}$$
$$\frac{\partial z}{\partial y} \approx \frac{e_{NE} + 2e_{N} + e_{NE} - e_{SW} - 2e_{S} - e_{SW}}{8r}$$

The slope (in percent) is then calculated using the Pythagorean theorem:

$$\tan \alpha = \sqrt{(\frac{\partial z}{\partial x})^2 + (\frac{\partial z}{\partial y})^2}$$

The second derivative of the surface (i.e., curvature) can be derived using similarly analogous calculations.

=== Aspect ===
The aspect of the terrain at any point on the surface is the direction the slope is "facing," or the cardinal direction of the steepest downhill slope. In principle, it is the projection of the gradient onto the horizontal slope. In practice using a raster digital elevation model, it is approximated using one of the same partial derivative approximation methods developed for slope. Then the aspect is calculated as:

$$\tan \beta = \frac{\frac{\partial z}{\partial y}}{-\frac{\partial z}{\partial x}}$$

This yields a counter-clockwise bearing, with 0° at east.

== Other derived products ==
=== Illumination/shaded relief/analytical hillshading ===
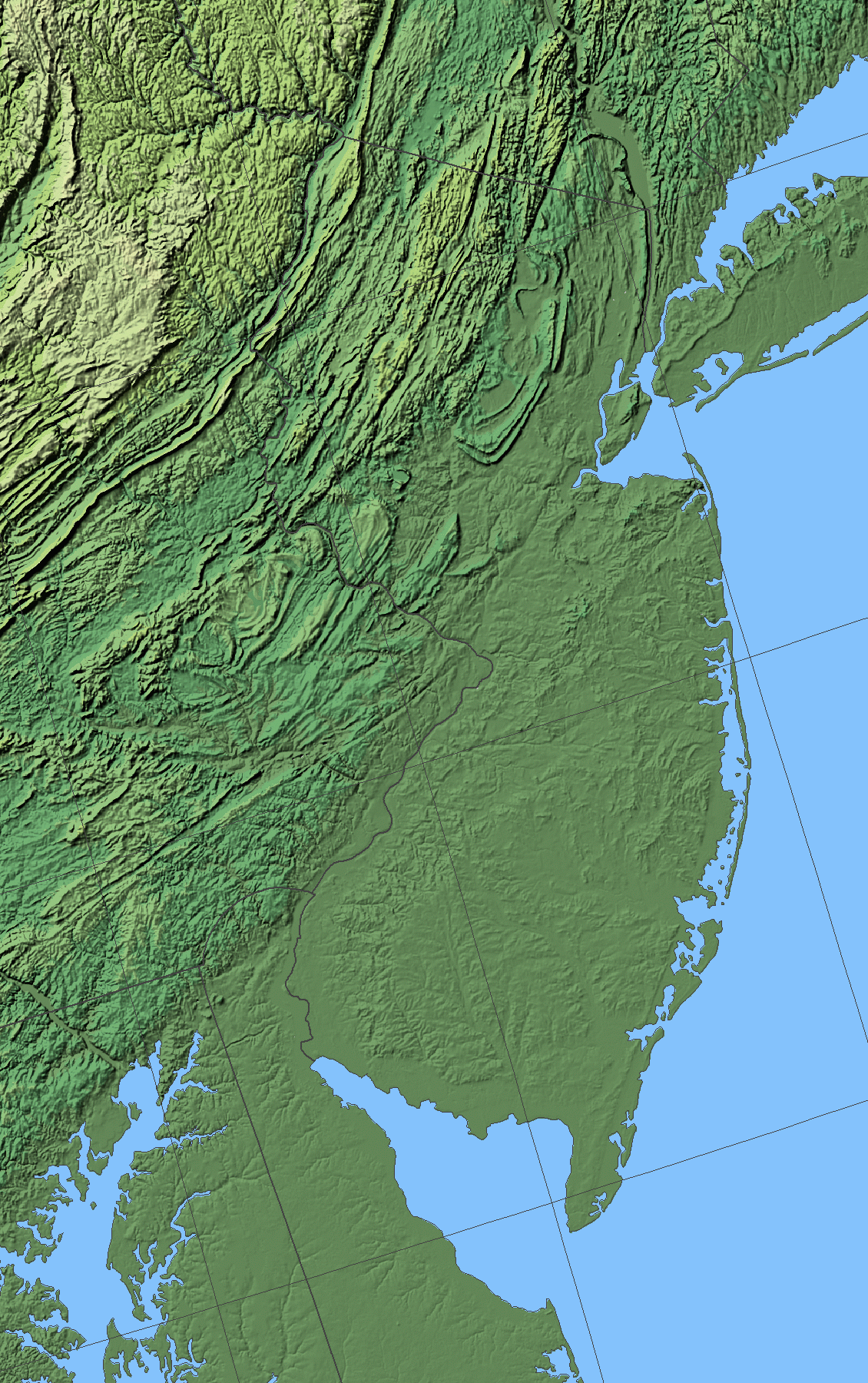
Shaded relief map of New Jersey

Another useful product derived from the terrain surface is a shaded relief image, which approximates the degree of illumination of the surface from a light source coming from a given direction. In principle, the degree of illumination is inversely proportional to the angle between the surface normal vector and the illumination vector; the wider the angle between the vectors, the darker that point on the surface is. In practice, it can be calculated from the slope α and aspect β, compared to a corresponding altitude φ and azimuth θ of the light source:

$$i = \cos \phi \cos \alpha + \sin \phi \sin \alpha \cos (\theta - \beta)$$

The resultant image is rarely useful for analytical purposes, but it is most commonly used as an intuitive visualization of the terrain surface because it looks like an illuminated three-dimensional model of the surface.

=== Topographic feature extraction ===
Natural terrain features, such as mountains and canyons, can often be recognized as patterns in elevation and their derivative properties. The most basic patterns include locations where the terrain changes abruptly, such as peaks (local elevation maxima), pits (local elevation minima), ridges (linear maxima), channels (linear minima), and passes (the intersections of ridges and channels).

Due to limitations of resolution, axis-orientation, and object-definitions the derived spatial data may yield meaning with subjective observation or parameterisation, or alternatively processed as fuzzy data to handle the varying contributing errors more quantitatively – for example as a 70% overall chance of a point representing the peak of a mountain given the available data, rather than an educated guess to deal with the uncertainty.

=== Local relief ===
In many applications, knowing how much the surface varies in each local area is useful. For example, one may need to distinguish between mountainous areas and high plateaus, both high in elevation but with different degrees of "ruggedness." The local relief of a cell is a measurement of this variability in the surrounding neighborhood (typically the cells within a given radius), for which several measures have been used, including simple summary statistics such as the total range of values in the neighborhood, an interquartile range, or the standard deviation. More complex formulas have also been developed to capture more subtle variation.

== Applications ==
Quantitative surface analysis through geomorphometrics provides various tools for scientists and managers interested in land management. Applications areas include:

=== Landscape ecology ===
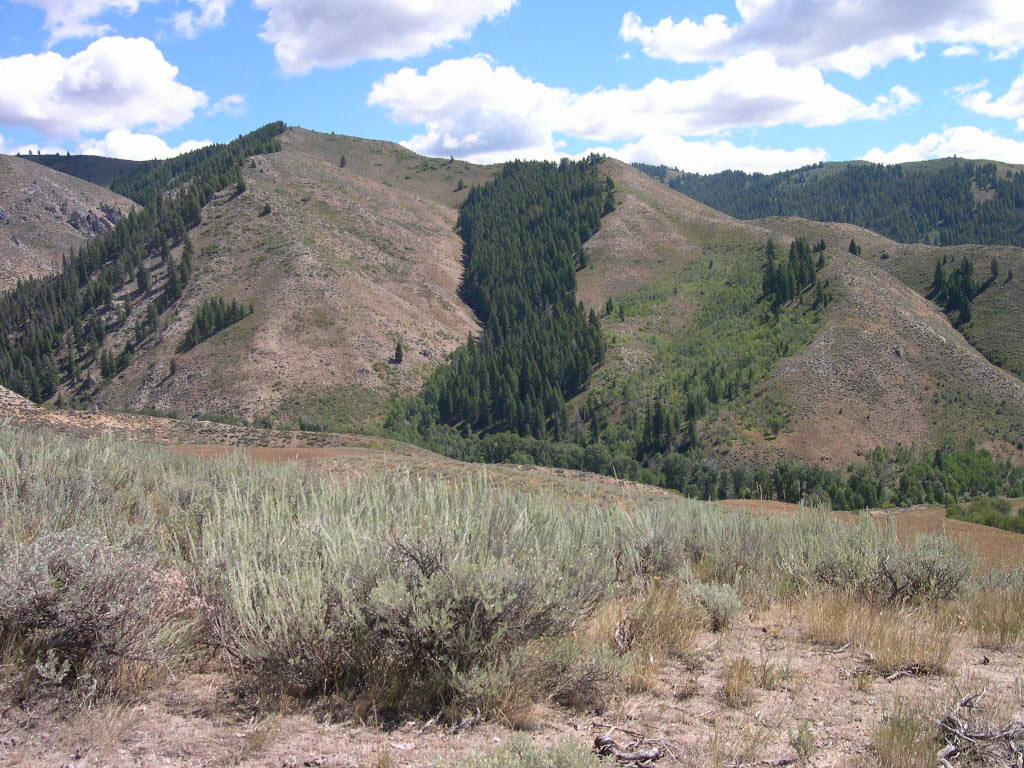
Slope effect of vegetation that is different on north-facing and south-facing slopes.

=== Biogeography ===
In many situations, terrain can profoundly affect local environments, especially in semi-arid climates and mountainous areas. This includes well-known effects such as Altitudinal zonation and the Slope effect. This can make it a significant factor in modeling and mapping microclimates, vegetation distribution, wildlife habitat, and precision agriculture.

=== Hydrology ===
Because water flows downhill, the surface derivatives of the terrain surface can predict surface stream flow. This can be used to construct stream networks, delineate drainage basins, and calculate total flow accumulation.

=== Visibility ===
Mountains and other landforms can block the visibility between locations on opposite sides. Predicting this effect is a valuable tool for applications as varied as military tactics and locating cell sites. Common tools in terrain analysis software include computing the line-of-sight visibility between two points and generating a viewshed, the region of all points visible from a single point.

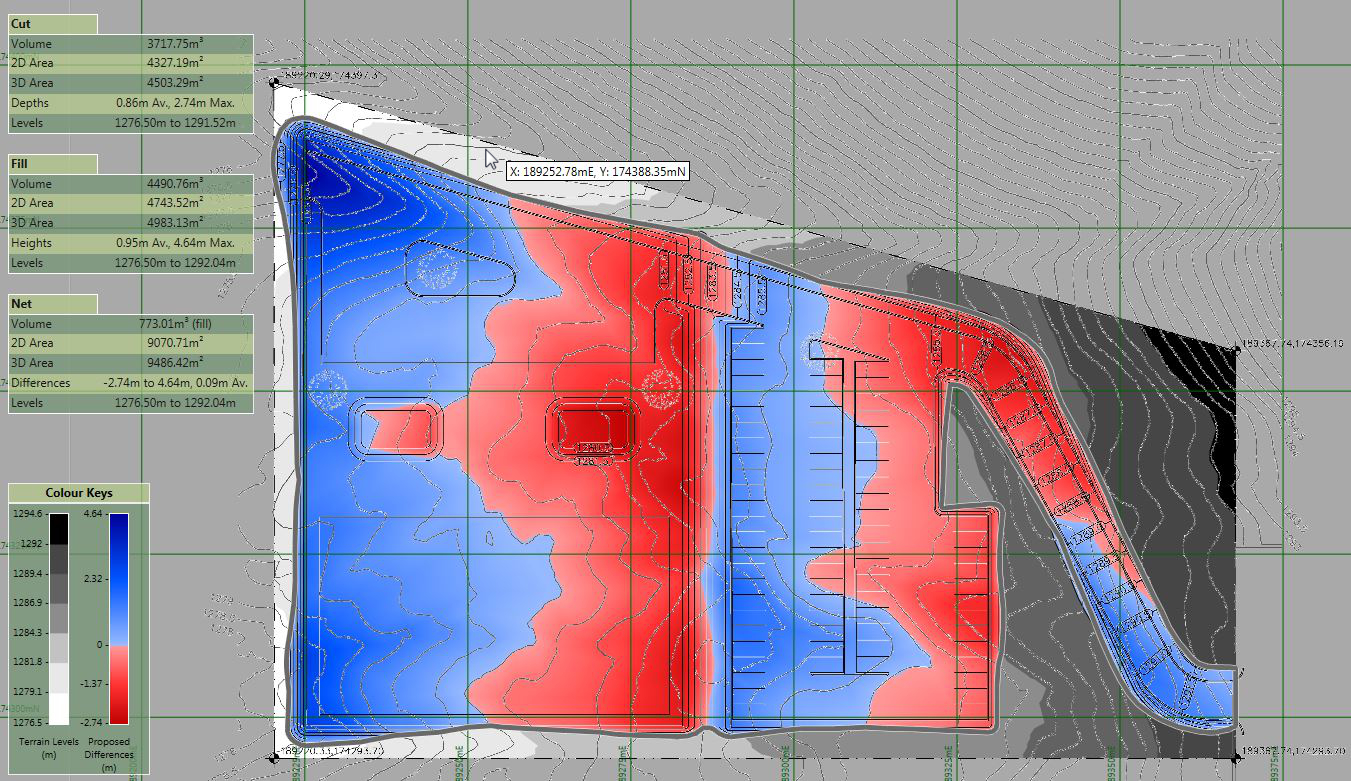
Map depicting cut and fill areas for a construction site.

=== Earthworks ===
Many construction projects require significant modification of the terrain surface, including both the removal and addition of material. By modeling the current and designed surface, engineers can calculate the volume of cuts and fills, and predict potential issues such as slope stability and erosion potential.

== Geomorphometricians ==
As a relatively new and unknown branch of GIS the topic of geomorphometrics has few 'famous' pioneer figures as is the case with other fields such as hydrology (Robert Horton) or geomorphology (G. K. Gilbert). In the past, geomorphometry has been used in many studies (including some high-profile geomorphology papers by academics such as Evans, Leopold, and Wolman). Still, it is only recently that GIS practitioners have begun to integrate it within their work. Nonetheless, it is becoming increasingly used by researchers such as Andy Turner and Joseph Wood.

== International organisations ==
Large institutions are increasingly developing GIS-based geomorphometric applications. One example is the creation of a Java-based software package for morphometrics in association with the University of Leeds.

== Training ==
Academic institutions are increasingly devoting more resources to geomorphometrics training and specific courses, although these are still limited to a few universities and training centres. The most accessible at present include an online geomorphometrics resource library in conjunction with the University of Leeds and lectures and practicals delivered as part of wider GIS modules, the most comprehensive at present offered at the University of British Columbia (overseen by Brian Klinkenberg) and at Dalhousie University.

== Software ==
The following computer software has specialized terrain analysis modules or extensions (listed in alphabetical order):

- ANUDEM
- ArcGIS (Spatial Analyst extension)
- GRASS GIS (r.param.scale, r.slope.aspect, etc.)
- ILWIS
- LandSerf
- SAGA GIS (Terrain analysis modules)
- Whitebox Geospatial Analysis Tools (Terrain Analysis, LiDAR Analysis, Hydrological Tools, and Stream Network Analysis modules)

== See also ==
- Digital Elevation Model – 3D computer-generated imagery and measurements of terrain
- Geography – Study of Earth's spatial information
- Geomatics – Geographic data discipline
- Geometry – Branch of mathematics
- Geographic information system – System to capture, manage, and present geographic data
- Geomorphology – Scientific study of landforms
- Landforms – Feature of the solid surface of a planetary body
- Landsat program – American network of Earth-observing satellites for international research purposes
- Morphometry – Quantitative study of size and shape
- Photogrammetry – Taking measurements using photography
- Remote sensing – Obtaining information through non-contact sensors
- Scientific modelling – Scientific activity that produces models
- Soil-surface roughness – Soil chacteristic
- Topography – Study of the forms of land surfaces in earth
