= Leaflet =

Leaflet may refer to:

- Leaflet (botany), part of a compound leaf
- Leaflet (software), a JavaScript library for interactive maps
- Pamphlet, a type of publication sometimes described as a folded leaflet
  - Flyer (pamphlet)
  - Airborne leaflet propaganda
- Cusps of heart valves, also known as leaflets
- Any of two layers of lipid bilayer, including biological membrane
