= Huanggang Creek =

River in Taiwan

Coordinates: 25°06′47″N 121°29′45″E

Huanggang Creek (Traditional Chinese: 磺港溪) is located in northern Taiwan, belonging to the Danshui River system and serving as a tributary of the Keelung River. With a length of approximately 10 kilometers and a watershed area of about 11.6 square kilometres, it is situated in the Beitou District of Taipei City. Its source is located around the western peak and southern peak of Mt. Datun. After the convergence of various tributaries, the creek flows through the prominent area of Beitou and then southward to join the Keelung River at the Zhongbaixian confluence.

One of the tributaries of Huanggang Creek, the Beitou Creek, flows through the geothermal valley, making it a well-known scenic spot.
