= Map Overlay and Statistical System =

Public domain software technology

Map Overlay and Statistical System (MOSS)
- Developer: MOSS Development Team
- Release: 1979
- Stable release: MOSS 1985 / 1985
- Written in: Fortran
- Operating system: Cross-platform
- Platform: CDC Cyber, Data General#Desktop Generation, HP 9000#Series 500, IBM PC compatible, Emulator
- Available in: English
- Type: Geographic information system
- License: Public domain
- Website: mossgis.org, www.osgeo.org/projects/moss/
- Repository: github.com/OSGeo/MOSS

The Map Overlay and Statistical System (MOSS), is a GIS software technology. Development of MOSS began in late 1977 and was first deployed for use in 1979. MOSS represents a very early public domain, open source GIS development - predating the better known GRASS by 5 years. MOSS utilized an integrated vector based data structure in which point, line, and polygon features could all be stored in the same map file. The user interacted with MOSS via a command line interface.

== History ==
In the middle 1970s, coal-mining activities required federal agencies to evaluate the impacts of strip mine development on wildlife and wildlife habitat. They were further tasked with evaluating and making recommendations regarding habitat mitigation.

In 1976, the US Fish and Wildlife Service (FWS) issued a request for proposals for developing a Geographic Information System (GIS) for environment impact and habitat mitigation studies. The scope of the project included completing a user needs assessment, developing a GIS functional scope, evaluating existing GIS technologies, and making recommendations to the USFWS as to the appropriate course of action for the development and deployment of GIS technology. In late 1976, the contract was awarded to the Federation of Rocky Mountain States, a not-for-profit organization. The contract number for this work was 14-16 0008-2155.

"The goal of this two year project was to develop an operational capability within the U.S. Fish and Wildlife Service (FWS) to accept, store, manipulate, and output spatially related data for use in a variety of FWS programs."

For the first six months of 1977, the project team worked on two tasks: A User Needs Assessment (Task 1) and an Inventory of Existing GIS technology (Task 2). The needs assessment involved interviewing wildlife biologists, natural resources planners, and other professionals that would be involved in wildlife habitat definition and habitat mitigation. The results of the assessment were published in the summer of 1977.

Concurrently, Carl Reed did an inventory of existing public domain and commercial GIS technology. This was Task 2 of the USFWS contract: "Survey, assess, and compare existing computer software systems and geographic data bases which are relevant to FWS determined needs. This may include federal, state, and private software and data bases". Approximately 70 different mapping and GIS software packages were identified. Of these, 54 had enough documentation and basic required functionality to warrant further analysis in terms of matching GIS functionality against user requirements. This report is a valuable historical document as it has information and details of GI systems used in the 1970s. The evaluation resulted in the determination that no existing GIS capability provided even a fraction of the functional capability required to meet user needs. Therefore, the decision was made to design and program a new interactive GIS application that used existing publicly available software whenever possible.

Using the user requirements as the design driver, the design of MOSS began during the summer of 1977. Once the design group, led by Carl Reed, agreed on the design, programming started. The development environment was a CDC mainframe running the Kronos operating system. Fortran IV was the development language. Graphics presentation and code development was done on a Tektronix 4010. Initial programming was completed by Carl Reed in 1978.

In 1978, MOSS was used in a pilot project in 1978 to test the validity of using the new MOSS software in a real world FWS habitat mitigation project. The pilot project used vector and raster map data digitized from USGS base maps, from aerial imagery, and maps provided by other agencies. The pilot project was successful and allowed additional enhancements and bug fixes to be accomplished for deploying MOSS for production use.

By 1979, a user-accessible version of MOSS was available on the CDC mainframe. In late 1979, the FWS purchased a Data General computer (AOS operating system) and required MOSS to be ported from the CDC mainframe to the DG minicomputer. This work was completed in the summer of 1980.

By the middle of 1980, the MOSS software suite was ready for production use. Once installed, operational, and properly documented at the WELUT facility in Fort Collins Colorado, an extensive technology transfer and training activity began. Within a few years, numerous other Federal agencies were using MOSS for a variety of projects. By 1983, MOSS was being used in the Bureau of Indian Affairs, multiple Bureau of Land Management state offices, the Bureau of Reclamation, National Park Service, US Army Engineering Topographic Labs, Fish and Wildlife Service, and numerous state, local and university organizations. The first MOSS users workshop was held in 1983 and had about 30 attendees. The second users workshop was held in Denver in 1984 with almost 150 attendees.

An early major project, completed in 1982, was for coastal habitat analysis, change detection, and impacts of dredge disposal along the Louisiana coast. Outputs from this system were presented to the State of Louisiana Senate and House Committees on Natural Resources. The project is described in detail in a paper presented at AutoCarto 5: THE ROLE OF THE USFWS GEOGRAPHIC INFORMATION SYSTEM IN COASTAL DECISION MAKING.

In 1984, the United States Geological Survey contracted with Autometric to perform a Feasibility and Design Study for the Enhancement of MOSS. MOSS was originally designed in 1977 for implementation on a main frame computer. Many of the logical design concepts current with the state-of-the-art at that time were superseded. Research into geoprocessing methodology, evolution of the capabilities of hardware and peripherals and the number of users and diversity of applications have resulted in the need to reassess MOSS. A draft report was submitted to USGS as a preliminary description of the logical functions for an enhanced public domain geoprocessing system.

== Architecture ==
MOSS allowed the user to store both vector and raster in the same geospatial database. The vector data could be points, lines, or polygons. MOSS utilized what at the time was referred to as a "full polygon" representation. In a full polygon representation, each polygon vertex shared with another polygon. Polygons could have islands (holes). Raster data were stored as pixels. The early versions of MOSS only allowed up to 32,000 coordinate pairs per line or polygon feature. This was due to Fortran array addressing issues. Raster images could be no larger than 32,000 pixels per row. Each map in a MOSS database could have up to 32,000 features. There was no limit on the number of maps in the database. Each map had a map header that contained a variety of metadata, such as the coordinate reference system (projection), date of creation, owner, data of last update, description, and so forth. Metadata was "searchable". For a full description of all of the MOSS functional capabilities please visit the 1985 version of the MOSS User's Manual
