= GeoNetwork opensource =

- Developers: GeoCat, Titellus, CampToCamp and others
- Stable release: 4.4.9 / 7 October 2025; 2 months ago
- Repository: github.com/geonetwork/core-geonetwork
- Written in: Java
- Operating system: Linux, MS-Windows, Mac OS X, POSIX compliant systems
- Platform: Java, Apache Tomcat
- Type: Geographic information system
- License: GPL
- Website: geonetwork-opensource.org

The GeoNetwork opensource (GNOS) project is a free and open source (FOSS) cataloging application for spatially referenced resources. It is a catalog of location-oriented information.

== Outline ==
It is a standardized and decentralized spatial information management environment designed to enable access to geo-referenced databases, cartographic products and related metadata from a variety of sources, enhancing the spatial information exchange and sharing between organizations and their audience, using the capacities of the internet. Using the Z39.50 protocol it both accesses remote catalogs and makes its data available to other catalog services. As of 2007, OGC Web Catalog Service are being implemented.

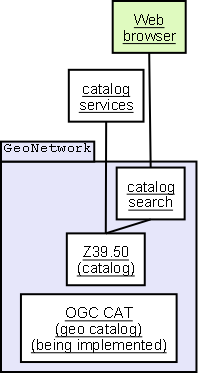
GeoNetwork interfaces

Maps, including those derived from satellite imagery, are effective communicational tools and play an important role in the work of decision makers (e.g., sustainable development planners and humanitarian and emergency managers) in need of quick, reliable and up-to-date user-friendly cartographic products as a basis for action and to better plan and monitor their activities; GIS experts in need of exchanging consistent and updated geographical data; and spatial analysts in need of multidisciplinary data to perform preliminary geographical analysis and make reliable forecasts.

== Deployment ==
The software has been deployed to various organizations, the first being FAO GeoNetwork and WFP VAM-SIE-GeoNetwork, both at their headquarters in Rome, Italy. Furthermore, the WHO, CGIAR, BRGM, ESA, FGDC and the Global Change Information and Research Centre (GCIRC) of China are working on GeoNetwork opensource implementations as their spatial information management capacity.

It is used for several risk information systems, in particular in the Gambia.

Several related tools are packaged with GeoNetwork, including GeoServer. GeoServer stores geographical data, while GeoNetwork catalogs collections of such data.

== See also ==
- Comparison of GIS software
- List of GIS software
- List of open source software packages
- Open Source Geospatial Foundation
