= Mapbox =

American provider of custom online maps for websites and applications

Mapbox, Inc.
- Type: Private
- Industry: Maps
- Founded: 2010; 16 years ago
- Founder: Bonnie Bogle; Eric Gundersen
- Headquarters: San Francisco, California; Washington, D.C., U.S.
- Key people: Peter Sirota (CEO); Eric Gundersen (CSO)
- Revenue: ▲$100 million (2019)
- Number of employees: 650+
- Website: mapbox.com

Mapbox is an American provider of custom online maps for websites and applications such as Foursquare, Lonely Planet, the Financial Times, The Weather Channel, Instacart, and Strava. Since 2010, it has rapidly expanded the niche of custom maps, as a response to the limited choice offered by map providers such as Google Maps.

By 2020, Mapbox had switched to a proprietary software license for most of the software it had maintained as open source. As of October 2020, Mapbox had a valuation of $1 billion.

== History ==
In 2010, the startup began as part of Development Seed to offer map customization to non-profit customers. It was bootstrapped until a 2013 $10 million Series A funding round by Foundry Group. In June 2015, Mapbox announced it had raised $52.55 million in a Series B round of funding led by DFJ Growth.

Early work on OpenStreetMap tools, including the iD editor, was funded by a $575,000 grant from the Knight Foundation.

On July 11, 2016, MapQuest discontinued the open tile API and users such as GNOME Maps were switched to a temporarily free tier of the Mapbox tileserver, while considering alternatives.

In October 2017, SoftBank led a $164 million investment in Mapbox Inc., with other existing investors including venture-capital firms Foundry Group, DFJ Growth, DBL Partners and Thrive Capital. In November 2017, Mapbox acquired the Belarus-based neural network startup Mapdata.

In January 2018, Mapbox acquired the team behind the open-source routing engine Valhalla.

In December 2020, Mapbox released the second version of their JavaScript library for online display of maps, Mapbox GL JS. Previously open source code under a BSD license, the new version switched to proprietary licensing. This resulted in a fork of the open source code, MapLibre GL, and initiation of the MapLibre project.

In March 2021, the company appointed a new chief executive officer, Peter Sirota, formerly of AWS. Sirota replaced Eric Gundersen, who became "chief strategy officer" and chairman of the board.

In June 2021, workers at Mapbox announced that a majority of US-based employees had signed and submitted union authorization cards to the National Labor Relations Board in order to be represented by the Communication Workers of America, through CODE-CWA. Mapbox declined to voluntarily recognize the union, requesting an election be held in addition to the card check. The election, conducted the following August, resulted in 123 votes against versus 81 in favor of forming a union, so the unionization vote failed.

On June 14, 2022, the NLRB issued a complaint against Mapbox, citing coercive actions, like threats and surveillance, and the firing of union organizers. Shortly after, an article was published describing the union busting tactics used at Mapbox. A court date was set for October 3, 2022, however a settlement agreement was ultimately reached.

In September 2023, Mapbox secured $280 million in Series E funding led by SoftBank, valuing the company at $1.3 billion.

In 2025, Mapbox expanded its presence in Europe, opening new offices in Berlin and London. At CES 2026, Mapbox and Toyota Motor North America announced that the new Toyota Audio Multimedia system with Mapbox navigation would launch on the 2026 RAV4 before rolling out to future Toyota models.

== Data sources and technology ==
The data is taken from open data sources, such as OpenStreetMap and NASA, and from purchased proprietary data sources, such as DigitalGlobe. The technology is based on Node.js, Mapnik, GDAL, and Leaflet.

Mapbox uses anonymized data from telemetry pings, such as Strava and Runkeeper, to identify likely missing data in OpenStreetMap with automatic methods, then manually applies the fixes or reports the issue to OSM contributors.

== See also ==
- TomTom
- ArcGIS
- HERE Maps
- Google Maps
- OpenStreetMap
- QGIS
- MapTiler
- Magic Lane
