= MapWindow GIS =

Open-source GIS desktop application

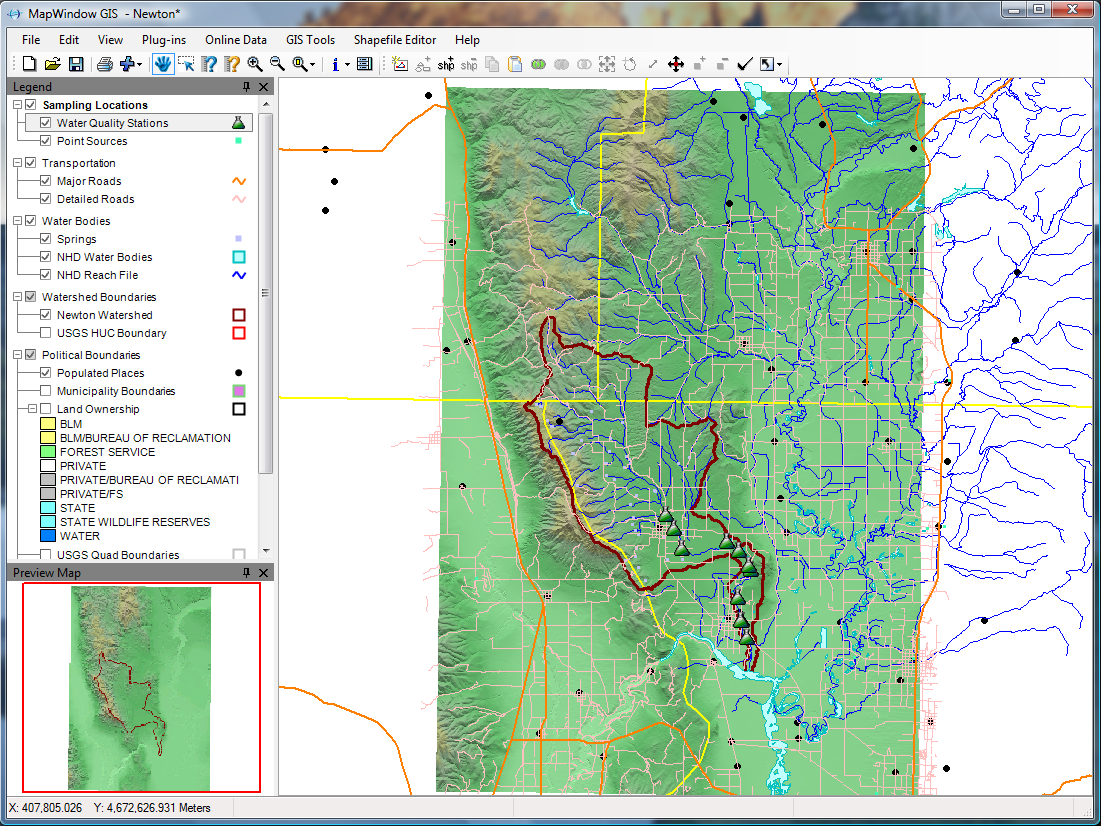
- MapWindow GIS 4.5 RC2 running on Windows Vista
- Developer: MapWindow Open Source Team
- Stable release: 4.8.8 / August 1, 2013
- Written in: C#
- Operating system: Microsoft Windows
- Type: Geographic information system
- License: MPL
- Website: https://www.mapwindow.org
- Repository: github.com/MapWindow/MapWinGIS

MapWindow GIS is a lightweight open-source GIS (mapping) desktop application and set of programmable mapping components.

== History ==
MapWindow GIS and its associated MapWinGIS ActiveX Control were originally developed by Daniel P. Ames and a team of professors and students at Utah State University in 2002-2003 as part of a research project with the Idaho National Laboratory in Idaho Falls, Idaho as a GIS mapping framework for watershed modelling tools in conjunction with source water assessments conducted by the laboratory.

In 2004 it the first open source version of the software was released as MapWindow GIS 3.0, after which it was adopted by the United States Environmental Protection Agency as the primary GIS platform for its BASINS (Better Assessment Science Integrating Point and Nonpoint Sources) watershed analysis and modeling software.

As the project has grown, much of the day-to-day management of the code and associated website has been handled by Paul Meems and a group of volunteer user-developers from around the world.

== Conferences ==
- The 1st International MapWindow GIS Users and Developers Conference was held in Orlando, Florida from March 31 - April 2, 2010 and included 60 participants from multiple countries and government, private, and educational institutions.
- The 2nd International MapWindow GIS and DotSpatial Conference included the newly developed DotSpatial GIS programming environment and was held in San Diego, California, June 13–15, 2011.
- The 2012 International Open Source GIS Conference was held in Velp, The Netherlands, from July 9–11, 2012. This was the first joint meeting of MapWindow GIS users and developers together with the broader regional open source GIS community.
- Later MapWindow GIS users and developers meetings have largely been held in conjunction with other communities and conferences including the American Water Resources Association, American Geophysical Union, OSGEO, and the International Environmental Modelling & Software Society.

== Technical details ==
MapWindow GIS is distributed as an open source application under the Mozilla Public License distribution license, MapWindow GIS can be reprogrammed to perform different or more specialized tasks. There are also plug-ins available to expand compatibility and functionality.

The core component of MapWindow GIS is the MapWinGIS ActiveX Control. This component (MapWinGIS.ocx) is written in the C++ programming language and includes all of the core mapping, data management, and data analysis functions required by the MapWindow GIS desktop application. A user manual for MapWinGIS ActiveX Control written by Daniel P. Ames and Dinesh Grover was released through in 2007.

The MapWindow GIS desktop application is built upon Microsoft .NET technology. Originally written using Visual Basic .NET, the application was re-written using C# .NET.

Project source code was originally hosted and maintained on a local SVN server on www.mapwindow.org. Later it was ported to the Microsoft open source code repository, codeplex.com. Presently all project code is hosted at GitHub.org.

Updates for MapWindow GIS are regularly released by a group of student and volunteer developers.

== MapWindow GIS in scientific literature ==
MapWindow GIS has found much adoption in the water resources and modelling community. Some example research projects using the software include:

- MapWindow GIS and its watershed delineation tool were used to generate terrain curvature networks by Burgholzer
- Fujisawa used MapWindow GIS in conjunction with Google Earth for data preparation.
- MapWindow GIS was extended with several plug-ins and custom datasets for the United Nations WaterBase project.
- MapWindow GIS was extended with a large number of watershed analysis plugins and was completely rebranded as BASINS by the United States Environmental Protection Agency.
- A "cost efficient" modelling tool for distributed hydrologic modelling was created by Lei et al.
- Fan et al. coupled a large scale water quality model with MapWindow GIS.

== See also ==
- List of GIS software
- Comparison of geographic information systems software
