= SPRING =

SPRING was a freeware geographic information system (GIS) and remote sensing image processing system. It was developed with an object-oriented data model and used for the integration of raster and vector data representations. It had Windows and Linux versions and provided a comprehensive set of functions, including tools for satellite image, digital terrain modeling, spatial analysis, geostatistics and spatial statistics, spatial databases and map management.

SPRING was developed since 1992 by the National Institute for Space Research (INPE) in Brazil. It had required over 200 man-years of development and included extensive documentation, tutorials and examples. More than 70,000 users from 60 countries have downloaded the software, as of January 2007. It was discontinued in 2019 and succeeded by INPE's TerraLib.
