= TerraLib =

Geographic information system software library

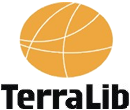
- Developers: INPE, TecGraf/PUC-RIO and FUNCATE
- Stable release: 5.4.3 / July 5, 2019
- Operating system: Linux, Windows
- Type: Geographic information system software library
- License: LGPL
- Website: www.terralib.org

TerraLib is an open-source geographic information system (GIS) software library. It extends object-relational database management systems (DBMS) to handle spatiotemporal data types.

Using TerraLib, the TerraView open-source GIS was developed, which provides functions for data conversion, visualization, exploratory spatial data analysis, spatial statistical modelling and spatial and non-spatial queries.

Another application is TerraAmazon, Brazil's national database for monitoring deforestation in the Amazon Rainforest. It handles more than 2 million complex polygons and 60 GB of remote sensing images.

== Design and development ==
The library supports different DBMS, including MySQL, PostgreSQL, and Oracle. Its vector data model is upwards compliant with Open Geospatial Consortium (OGC) standards. TerraLib supports the development of geographical applications using spatial databases.

The design goal for TerraLib is to support large-scale applications using socioeconomic and environmental data. It handles spatiotemporal data types (events, moving objects, cell spaces, modifiable objects) and allows spatial, temporal and attribute queries on the database. TerraLib supports dynamic modelling in generalized cell spaces and has a dynamic link with the R programming language for statistical analysis. It handles large image data sets. TerraLib is implemented as a library of C++ classes and functions, written in ANSI-C++, and has programming interfaces in Java and Visual Basic.

TerraLib has a core development team based in Brazil. The team includes the Image Processing Division of Brazil's National Institute for Space Research (INPE), and the Computer Graphics Technology Group of the Pontifical Catholic University of Rio de Janeiro (PUC-Rio). TerraLib is licensed as open-source according to the GNU Lesser General Public License (LGPL).

== TerraView ==
TerraView is a GIS application built on the TerraLib GIS library. TerraView handles vector data (polygons, lines, points) and raster data (grids and images), both of them stored in a relational or geo-relational database, including ACCESS, PostgreSQL, MySQL and Oracle Spatial. TerraView has a visualization interface that allows attribute and spatial queries on object in geographical database. The interface allows different views on the database, producing thematic maps with different types of legends.

TerraView is able to manage raster data in geographical database and allows the visualization and manipulation of raster data together with vector data. Raster data can be shared in different formats such as GeoTIFF, TIFF, JPEG, RAW, ASCII-Grid or ASCIISpring.

TerraView supports vector operations including intersection and buffer maps. It also has statistical analysis functions: local and global autocorrelation indexes, semivariograms, and regionalisation. TerraView is free software distributed under the GPL license and is available on the Internet.

== TerraAmazon ==
TerraAmazon
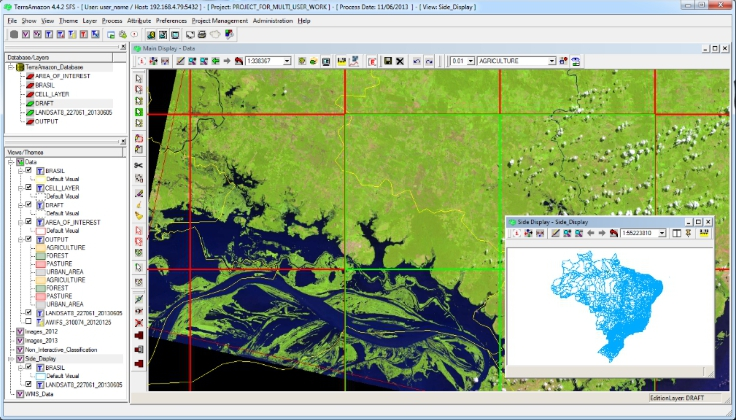
- TerraAmazon running on Windows.
- Developers: INPE, FUNCATE
- Release: 2005; 21 years ago
- Stable release: 4.4.3 / February 11, 2014
- Written in: C++
- Operating system: Windows, at least Windows XP
- Type: Geographic information system software
- License: LGPL
- Website: www.terraAmazon.org

TerraAmazon is a free GIS software developed by Brazil´s National Institute for Space Research (INPE) and FUNCATE. TerraAmazon is a tool designed to be a multi-user editor of geographic vectorial data. It was developed to improve the corporate production of geographic data in order to provide accurate measurement of deforestation, forest degradation, land use and land cover change and similar applications. The data accessed by TerraAmazon is stored in a TerraLib model database and is worked within an intranet client–server environment, typically using PostgreSQL. It can operate both online and offline through the use of an open-source library.

TerraAmazon was first developed by INPE and FUNCATE in early 2005. It was initially applied to PRODES project to monitor Brazil's Amazon rainforest. Due to its multi-user characteristic, it quickly conquered space, being used in other projects, such as DETER, DEGRAD and the Brazilian Second National Communication to the UNFCCC, among other relevant projects. TerraAmazon was made available to the public only in 2010. With the creation of INPE's Amazon Regional Center (CRA), located in Belém (Brazil), TerraAmazon reached international space, having regular trainings being held in CRA's facilities for both national and international specialists.

TerraAmazon accepts vector files only in shapefile (.shp) format. Raster files are accepted in the following formats: geotiff files (.tiff), jpg files (.jpg), Spring Grid Files (.spr), binary RAW files (.raw) and ESRI ASCII Grid Files (.txt). Currently there are three plugins that available for TerraAmazon. They are also developed by INPE and FUNCATE and are provided within the installer of the system.

- Image Processing Plugin (DIP Plugin): contains tools to register and orthorectificate images, run segmentations, linear mixture models, etc.
- Cloud Detection: contains one single tool for cloud detection.
- TerraPrint (Beta version): contains tools to produce layouts with the data

== See also ==
- SPRING
