= LandSerf =

Geographic information system for surface models

LandSerf is a free geographic information system for editing, processing and visualizing spatial data. It is particularly suited to handling Digital Elevation Models (DEMs) and other surface models. It is written in Java and runs on Windows, Mac OS and Linux platforms.

== History ==
The first version of LandSerf was written in 1996 as a platform for performing scale-based analysis of Digital Elevation Models. It implemented the idea of multiscale surface characterisation proposed by Jo Wood where characteristics such as slope, curvature and feature type could be measured over a range of spatial scales.

Subsequent releases of the software have enhanced its visualization capabilities (for example, 3d real-time flythroughs using OpenGL) and the range of file formats it can import and export. With the addition of Vector handling (1998), attribute tables (2003) and raster and Vector overlay (2004), LandSerf can be regarded as an example of a Geographic Information System (GIS).

== Applications ==
LandSerf has been used in a range of application areas including landscape visualization, geomorphology, ecology, archaeology, 3d gaming, GPS mapping and file format conversion.

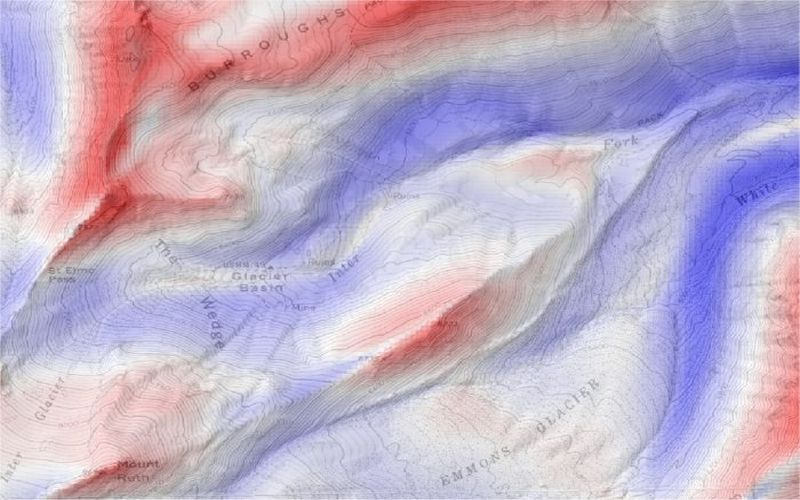
Convexity

== Availability ==
LandSerf is not open source, but it is freely available and has a documented API to allow Java programmers to customise and enhance the software.
