= MapDotNet =

Suite of geographic information system software

- Developer: ISC
- Stable release: UX 9.0.4.0 / April 2013; 13 years ago
- Operating system: Windows
- Type: Geographic information system
- License: Proprietary
- Website: mapdotnet.com (Defunct)

MapDotNet is a suite of geographic information system (GIS) software products developed by ISC that run on Microsoft Windows. The GIS software competes with ESRI and MapInfo GIS products. MapDotNet UX is the latest generation and consists of a set of WCF web services for rendering map images and tiles and for performing spatial analysis and editing. UX includes an SDK for developing rich interactive mapping applications on Microsoft Silverlight, Windows Presentation Foundation and HTML5. MapDotNet UX also includes an Extract, Transform & Load (ETL), map design and tile cache creation tool called Studio modeled after Microsoft's Expression series of products. The MapDotNet UX renderer is built on WPF and consumes spatial data from multiple sources including Shapefiles, PostGIS, ArcSDE, Oracle Spatial, SQL Azure, SQL Server 2008 R2 and SQL Server 2012.

== MapDotNet UX Studio (Freeware) ==
MapDotNet UX Studio is a Windows desktop application created for designing interactive maps in Silverlight and WPF, as well as AJAX. It includes utilities for tile cache management and spatial data transfer, with support for Microsoft SQL Server 2008, Shapefiles, PostGIS and ArcSDE.

MapDotNet UX Studio is developed using Windows Presentation Framework (WPF), that is designed to look and feel like the Microsoft Expression suite of applications including Microsoft Expression Blend, and is meant to be used to design maps and manage geospatial platform resources.

Studio includes the ability to work with data and maps on a server that has the MapDotNet UX Web Services installed, or locally on your workstation without an active connection to a server. Working with the local system instead of a server allows users to create maps and transfer data when disconnected from a server.

== MapDotNet UX Web Services ==
MapDotNet UX Web Services combines WCF-based Web Services and the WPF Map and Tile Renderer. Manage spatial data from all supported formats with Web Services. The Map and Tile Renderer displays your symbol libraries, legend data, overlays and map tiles through a hardware-accelared rendering engine.

== MapDotNet UX SDK ==
The MapDotNet UX SDK contains WPF and Silverlight 4.0 controls and an extensive class library for .NET 4.0 as well as an HTML5 map control.

== MapDotNet UX Engine ==
MapDotNet UX Engine is composed of a set of .NET assemblies which can be linked in to Windows desktop applications. Engine includes all of the core functionality of the MapDotNet UX Web Services, but is appropriate for use in desktop applications which need to operate in a disconnected state, without an Internet or network connection.

== Bing Maps, WMS and OpenStreetMap Support ==
MapDotNet UX provides direct support for Microsoft Bing Maps, Web Map Service (WMS), and OpenStreetMap (OSM). Maps from any of these services can be visualized on top of or under any other support map type using MapDotNet UX.

== About ISC ==
The MapDotNet product line is developed, sold and supported by ISC, a Florida corporation. ISC is a computer software development company offering software development services, software as a service, and software development consulting services.
