= Leaflet (software) =

JavaScript library for web mapping applications

- Original author: Volodymyr Agafonkin
- Release: May 13, 2011
- Stable release: 1.9.4 / 18 May 2023; 3 years ago
- Written in: JavaScript
- Platform: See Browser support
- Type: JavaScript library
- License: BSD-2-Clause
- Website: leafletjs.com
- Repository: github.com/Leaflet/Leaflet

Leaflet is a JavaScript library used to build web mapping applications. It allows developers to display tiled web maps hosted on a public server, with optional tiled overlays. It can load feature data from GeoJSON files, style it and create interactive layers, such as markers with popups when clicked.

First released in 2011, it supports most mobile and desktop platforms, supporting HTML5 and CSS3. Among its users are FourSquare, Pinterest, Flickr, and the USGS.

Leaflet is open source, and is developed by Ukrainian developer Volodymyr Agafonkin, who joined Mapbox in 2013. After the invasion of Ukraine by Russia in 2022, a version of logo was created to reflect the colours of Ukraine, which is used on a pop-up the first page of the website, promoting support for Ukraine.

== Use ==
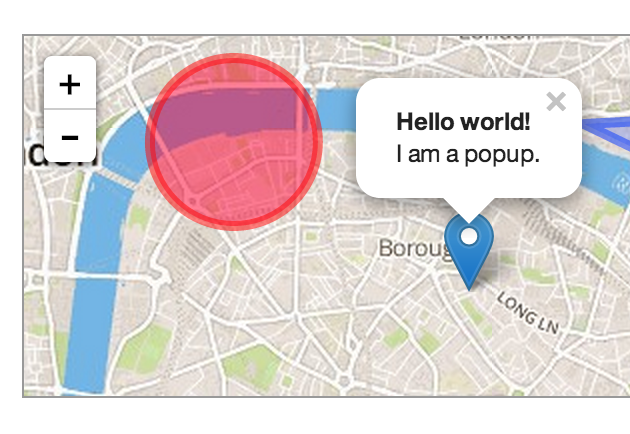
A basic demo using Leaflet.

A typical use of Leaflet involves binding a Leaflet "map" element to an HTML element such as a div. Layers and markers are then added to the map element.

== Features ==
Leaflet supports Web Map Service (WMS) layers, GeoJSON layers, Vector layers and Tile layers natively. Many other types of layers are supported via plugins.

Like other web map libraries, the basic display model implemented by Leaflet is one basemap, plus zero or more translucent overlays, with zero or more vector objects displayed on top.

=== Elements ===
The major Leaflet object types are:

- Raster types (TileLayer and ImageOverlay)
- Vector types (Path, Polygon, and specific types such as Circle)
- Grouped types (LayerGroup, FeatureGroup and GeoJSON)
- Controls (Zoom, Layers, etc.)

There is also a variety of utility classes such as interfaces for managing projections, transformations and interacting with the Document Object Model (DOM).

=== Support for GIS formats ===
Leaflet has core support for multiple geographic information system (GIS) standard formats, with others supported in plugins.

Standard	Support
GeoJSON	Good, core support through the geoJson function
KML, CSV, WKT, TopoJSON, GPX	Supported in Leaflet-Omnivore plugin
TMS	Core support through TileLayer
WMS	Core support through the TileLayer.WMS subtype
WFS	Not supported, although third-party plugins exist.
GML	Not supported.

=== Browser support ===
Leaflet 1.9 supports Chrome, Firefox, Safari 5+, Opera 12+, IE 9–11 and Edge.

Leaflet 0.7 supported Chrome, Firefox, Safari 5+, Opera 12+ and IE 7–11.

== Comparison with other libraries ==
Leaflet is directly comparable with OpenLayers, as both are open source, client-side only JavaScript libraries. The library as a whole is much smaller, around 7,000 lines of code compared to OpenLayers' 230,000 (as of 2015). It has a smaller code footprint than OpenLayers (around 123 KB vs 423 KB) due partly to its modular structure. The code base is newer, and takes advantage of recent features of JavaScript, plus HTML5 and CSS3. However, Leaflet lacks features OpenLayers supports, such as Web Feature Service (WFS) and native support for projections other than Google Web Mercator (EPSG 3857).

It is also comparable to the proprietary, closed source Google Maps API (debuting in 2005) and Bing Maps API, both of which incorporate a significant server-side component to provide services such as geocoding, routing, search and integration with features such as Google Earth. Google Maps API provides speed and simplicity, but is not flexible, and can only be used to access Google Maps services. The new DataLayer part of Google's API does allow external data sources to be displayed, however.

== History ==
Leaflet began life in 2010 as "Web Maps API", a JavaScript library for the CloudMade mapping provider, where Agafonkin worked at the time. In May 2011, CloudMade announced the first release of Leaflet, built from scratch but using parts of the old API code.

- 0.1: 17 May 2011
- 0.2: 18 June 2011
- 0.3: 14 February 2012
- 0.4: 30 July 2012
- 0.5: 17 January 2013
  - This release introduced Retina support and many usability and user experience improvements.
- 0.6: 26 June 2013
  - This release expanded the API's range of methods and events, improved usability, and added GeoJSON saving. It was completed in a 2-day code sprint supported by Mapbox.
- 0.7: 22 November 2013
  - This release focused on bug fixing, announcing that refactoring and potential backward incompatibilities would come soon.
- 1.0: 27 September 2016
  - This release contained over 400 changes compared to v0.7.7:
    - Performance improvements in all aspects of the library and vector layers in particular.
    - Flyover animations (zooming and panning in a curve).
    - Fractional zoom level support.
    - Better tile loading algorithm with less flickering.
    - Custom pane management (including multiple vector layer panes and interleaving vectors and tile layers).
    - Better support for non-standard projections.
    - More accessibility features.
    - Improved documentation.
    - Stability improvements.
- 1.1: 27 June 2017
  - This release adds video overlays and makes a transition to ECMAScript 6 modules.
- 1.2: 25 October 2017
- 1.3: 15 January 2018
- 1.3.2: 17 July 2018
- 1.3.3: 18 July 2018
- 1.3.4: 21 August 2018
- 1.4.0: 30 December 2018
- 1.5.0 and 1.5.1: 8 May 2019
- 1.6.0: 17 November 2019
- 1.7.0 and 1.7.1: 4 September 2020
- 1.8: 18 April 2022
- 1.9: 22 September 2022

In March 2022, the developer urged action on the Russian invasion of Ukraine on the Leaflet website.
