= SAGA GIS =

Geographic information system software for editing spatial data

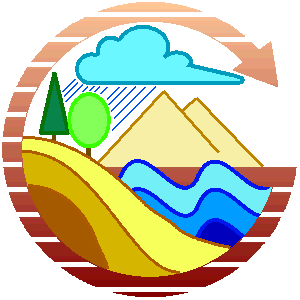

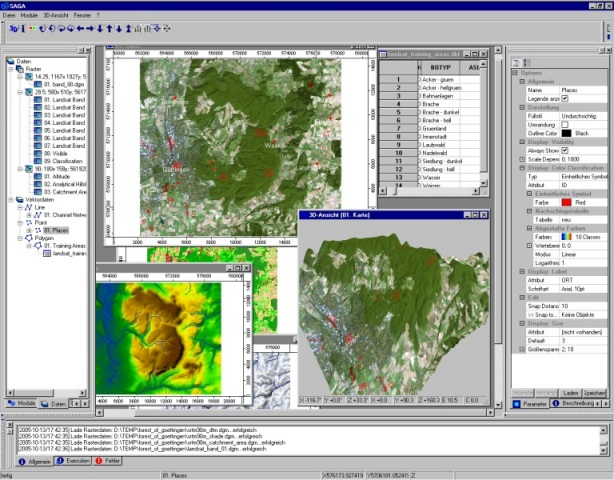
- Developers: Departments for Physical Geography, Hamburg and Göttingen, Germany; SAGA User Group Association (from May 2005)
- Initial release: February 2004; 22 years ago
- Stable release: 9.5.1 / 16 July 2024; 19 months ago
- Written in: C++ (wxWidgets)
- Operating system: Cross-platform
- Available in: English, German, Czech
- Type: Geographic information system
- License: GNU General Public License
- Website: www.saga-gis.org
- Repository: sourceforge.net/p/saga-gis/code/ci/master/tree/

System for Automated Geoscientific Analyses (SAGA GIS) is a geographic information system (GIS) computer program, used to edit spatial data. It is free and open-source software, developed originally by a small team at the Department of Physical Geography, University of Göttingen, Germany, and is now being maintained and extended by an international developer community.

SAGA GIS is intended to give scientists an effective but easily learnable platform for implementing geoscientific methods. This is achieved by the application programming interface (API). SAGA has a fast-growing set of geoscientific methods, bundled in exchangeable module libraries.

The standard modules are:

- File access: interfaces to various table, vector, image and grid file formats, including shapefiles, Esri grids (ASCII and binary), and many grid file formats supported by the Geospatial Data Abstraction Library (GDAL), along with the native SGRD format of SAGA GIS.
- Filter for grids: Gaussian, Laplacian, multi-directional Lee filter.
- Gridding: interpolation from vector data using triangulation, nearest neighbour, inverse distance.
- Geostatistics: residual analysis, ordinary and universal kriging, single and multiple regression analysis, variance analysis.
- Grid calculator: combine grids through user defined functions.
- Grid discretisation: skeletonisation, segmentation.
- Grid tools: merging, resampling, gap filling.
- Image classification: cluster analysis, box classification, maximum likelihood, pattern recognition, region growing.
- Projections: various coordinate transformations for vector and grid data (using Proj4 and GeoTrans libraries), georeferencing of grids.
- Simulation of dynamic processes: TOPMODEL, nitrogen distributions, erosion, landscape development.
- Terrain analysis: geomorphometric calculations such as slope, aspect, curvatures, curvature classification, analytical hillshading, sink elimination, flow path analysis, catchment delineation, solar radiation, channel lines, relative altitudes.
- Vector tools: polygon intersection, contour lines from grid.

SAGA GIS is an effective tool with user friendly graphical user interface (GUI) that requires only about 10 MB disk space. No installation is needed, since SAGA GIS can be run directly from a USB thumb drive if desired.

SAGA GIS is available for Windows, Linux, and FreeBSD.

SAGA GIS can be used together with other GIS software like Kosmo and QGIS in order to obtain enhanced detail in vector datasets as well as higher-resolution map-production capabilities. SAGA GIS modules can be executed from within the statistical data analysis software R, in order to integrate statistical and GIS analyses.
