= Manifold System =

Geographic information system software

- Developer: Manifold Software Limited
- Stable release: 9.0.182.1 / 1 September 2025
- Operating system: Windows
- Type: GIS
- License: Proprietary
- Website: http://www.manifold.net

Manifold System is a geographic information system (GIS) software package developed by Manifold Software Limited that runs on Microsoft Windows. Manifold System handles both vector and raster data, includes spatial SQL, a built-in Internet Map Server (IMS), and other general GIS features.

== History ==
The development team for Manifold was created in 1993 to optimize mathematics libraries for a massively-parallel supercomputer created in a joint venture between Intel Corporation and the US Department of Defense. The team subsequently embarked on a plan to create and sell mathematics libraries, including the General Graph Facilities library (GGF) and the Computational Geometry Library (CGL), under the name of the Center for Digital Algorithms.

A series of "workbench" products were created to help teach customers the operation of algorithms in the libraries using visual means. Road networks and geometric data in geographic contexts were used to provide visual familiarity and interest, in effect creating a GIS-like product. In 1997 and 1998 customers asked for a true GIS product based on the workbench products and development of Manifold System was launched. The company soon changed its name to Manifold Software Limited to match the new product's name.

== Manifold System releases ==
Manifold System was first sold in January 1998 as Release 3.00. Releases 3.00 and 4.00 were heavily weighted to analytics, with many tools for abstract graph theory analysis but a very limited GIS toolset. Release 4.50 emphasized general GIS features of broader interest and emerged as Manifold's first commercial GIS, a typical vector GIS more or less equivalent to classic vector GIS packages such as ArcView 3.x or MapInfo Professional.

The Release 5.00 series in 2001 and 2002 integrated display and editing of raster images and surfaces, including terrain elevation surfaces, and both 2D and 3D rendering. The 5.x series also introduced an integrated Internet Map Server (IMS) and the first Enterprise editions of Manifold System allowing collaboration by teams using shared components. The 5.x series also introduced a new spatial SQL and fuzzy logic using the Decision Support System.

Releases since 2003 include 5.50, 6.00 (two major feature upgrades via service pack), 6.50, 7.00 and 7x. 6.50 introduced image tiling from Terraserver and OGC WMS image servers using Manifold as a client and extended IMS support to include OGC WMS when using Manifold as a server. 7.00 further extended IMS to include OGC WFS-T and image server functionality as well.

Release 7.00 was issued in May 2006 and followed up by Release 7x in the next three months. Release 7.00 introduced direct support for Oracle Spatial (vector drawings, raster images and raster surfaces) and included concurrent multiuser editing capability for Oracle and a variety of other databases, including DB2 and Microsoft SQL Server. 7.00 introduced multiprocessor support with multithreaded rendering of image libraries, multithreaded connections to DBMS providers and use of multiple processors in other areas as well.

7.00 also introduced the Manifold Image Server interface API, allowing users to create modules that enable usage within Manifold of image servers such as Virtual Earth, Google Maps, Yahoo, Ask and others. Open source image server modules have been published by the user community in both 32-bit and 64-bit versions that enable automatic fetching and tiling of either satellite images or street map images from various image servers.

Release 8.00 was issued in the summer of 2007. 8.00 expanded support for direct use of spatial DBMS beyond Oracle to include IBM DB2 with Spatial Extender, PostgreSQL / PostGIS and pre-releases of Microsoft's SQL Server 2008 spatial product available in 2007. 8.00 also introduced a Manifold-written spatial extender for Microsoft SQL Server 2005 as well as generic spatial DBMS capability from Manifold enabling spatial DBMS storage of vectors and rasters in any DBMS providing binary storage capability.

8.00 was updated through 2008 to improve support for PostgreSQL/PostGIS, to support final production releases of Microsoft SQL Server 2008 and to support new Windows releases through Windows Server 2008 x64.

In December 2015 Manifold.net announced that Manifold's parallel database engine for OEMs, Radian, would be the foundation for future releases of Manifold System GIS, and provided a road map for Radian Studio and Manifold Release 9 implementations in 2016. Beta testing for Radian commenced in 2016 with a first release of Radian Studio in February 2017.

A series of updates for 8.00 were issued in 2017 to add integration with ODBC access to Radian data sources. This gave Release 8 the ability to connect, through Radian, to any data source Radian can use, expanding Release 8 connectivity to data sources 8.00 previously could not access, such as MrSID, ESRI file geodatabases, numerous GDAL/OGR sources and similar.

Manifold Viewer, a free version of Radian Studio was issued in June, 2017. Viewer included all features of Radian Studio except printing, scripting, export, writing of projects, and GPU parallelism, although including CPU parallelism. Viewer editions automatically track and include changes and bug fixes to Radian Studio / Manifold System.

Manifold System Release 9 was issued in December 2017 as a pre-release for Radian Studio licensees with first initial release in January, 2018. Radian Studio was deprecated in favor of Release 9, a superset of Radian Studio.
