= TNTmips =

- Line editing with Tntmips Pro 2013 on Windows 7
- Developer(s): MicroImages, Inc.
- Initial release: March 3, 1986; 39 years ago
- Stable release: 2021 / January 5, 2021; 4 years ago
- Operating system: Mac OS X Microsoft Windows
- Type: Geographic information system
- License: Proprietary commercial software
- Website: www.microimages.com/products/

TNTmips is a geospatial analysis system providing a fully featured GIS, RDBMS, and automated image processing system with CAD, TIN, surface modeling, map layout and innovative data publishing tools. TNTmips has a single integrated system with an identical interface, functionality, and geodata structure for use on Mac and Windows operating systems. The interface, database text content, messages, map production, and all other internal aspects of TNTmips have been localized for use in many languages, including, for example Arabic, Thai, and all romance languages. The professional version of TNTmips is in use in over 120 nations while the TNTmips Free version (restricted in project size) is used worldwide for educational, self learning, and small projects (e.g., archaeological sites, neighborhood planning, and precision farming).

== History ==
TNTmips was initially branded MIPS from its creation in 1986 until 2022.

== General information ==
TNTmips is a system for fully integrated GIS, CAD, with integrated geospatial database management.

== License levels ==
- TNTmips Pro (professional license),
- TNTmips Basic (low cost license),
- TNTmips Free (freeware).

== Special Academic License (SAL) ==
The TNT products include: TNTmips, TNTedit, TNTview, TNTatlas and TNTsdk. There is no distinction between TNTmips and TNT products with regards to license levels. All TNT products are available for Windows and Macintosh computers in a growing number of international languages.
