= ILWIS =

Geographic information system and remote sensing software

- Developer: 52°North ILWIS Community
- Stable release: 3.8.6 / 22 January 2020; 5 years ago
- Repository: github.com/52North/IlwisCore
- Written in: C++
- Operating system: Windows
- Type: Geographic information system
- License: GPL-2.0-only
- Website: 52north.org/downloads/ilwis

Integrated Land and Water Information System (ILWIS) is a geographic information system (GIS) and remote sensing software for both vector and raster processing. Its features include digitizing, editing, analysis and display of data, and production of quality maps. ILWIS was initially developed and distributed by ITC Enschede (International Institute for Geo-Information Science and Earth Observation) in the Netherlands for use by its researchers and students. Since 1 July 2007, it has been released as free software under the terms of the GPL-2.0-only license. Having been used by many students, teachers and researchers for more than two decades, ILWIS is one of the most user-friendly integrated vector and raster software programmes currently available. ILWIS has some very powerful raster analysis modules, a high-precision and flexible vector and point digitizing module, a variety of very practical tools, as well as a great variety of user guides and training modules all available for downloading. The current version is ILWIS 3.8.6. Similar to the GRASS GIS in many respects, ILWIS is currently available natively only on Microsoft Windows. However, a Linux Wine manual had been released in 2009 by the World Institute for Conservation and Environment (WICE).

== History ==
In late 1984, ITC was awarded a grant from the Dutch Ministry of Foreign Affairs, which led to developing a geographic information system (GIS) which could be used as a tool for land use planning and watershed management studies. By the end of 1988, an MS-DOS version 1.0 of the Integrated Land and Water Information System (ILWIS) was released. Two years later, ILWIS was made commercial with ITC establishing a worldwide distributors network. ILWIS 2.0 for Windows was released at the end of 1996, and ILWIS 3.0 by mid-2001. On 1 January 2004, ILWIS 3.2 was released as a shareware (one-month trial offer). Since July 1, 2007, ILWIS has been distributed as an open source software under the GPL-2.0-only license.

=== Release history ===
This table is based on.

Old Version	Current Version	Future Version

Branch	Version	Release date	Significant changes
3.1	3.1	April 2002	
3.1	Patch 3.11	September 2002	Direct import of Aster satellite images level 1a and 1b, including all needed geometric and radiometric corrections. This functionality is integrated in the Import Map Wizard.
3.1	Patch 3.11	September 2002	Stereopair from DTM - Stereo pair from DTM operation creates a stereo pair from a single raster map and a Digital Terrain Model (DTM). These stereo pairs have the same usability as the Epipolar Stereo Pair.
3.1	Patch 3.12a	August 2003	ID Grid map - creates a polygon map given a coordinate system and an attribute table. The polygon map consists of rectangular grid cells with a unique ID and can be linked to a table with attribute data when sample data is available.
3.1	Patch 3.12a	August 2003	Spherical Distance option was added to the operations Spatial Correlation, Cross Variogram, Nearest Point, Moving Average, Moving Surface, Kriging and CoKriging. This option calculates distances over the sphere instead of in a plane.
3.1	Patch 3.12a	August 2003	Export to ArcPad .PRJ - ILWIS coordinate systems can be exported to an ArcPad .prj file.
3.2	3.2	January, 2004	Spatial Multiple Criteria Evaluation (SMCE)
3.2	3.2	January, 2004	Hydrologic Flow Operations
3.2	3.2	January, 2004	Find Datum Parameters Wizard
3.2	3.2	January, 2004	GARtrip import
3.2	Patch 3.21	August, 2004	Extensions in Spatial Multiple Criteria Evaluation - slicing, histograms, aggregated values, and an improvement in class map standardization.
3.2	Patch 3.21	August, 2004	Improvement in calling external executable files - Support for parameter passing, wait-till-finished option and error handling, and inclusion in a script as part of a batch process.
3.2	Patch 3.21	August, 2004	Support for coordinates for images from the MeteoSat-8 satellite.
3.3	3.3	September 2005	The SMCE application extended with overlay of reference maps, combination of spatial and non-spatial MCE, and interactive function graphs for standardization.
3.3	3.3	September 2005	Applications for DEM hydroprocessing implemented, like topological optimization, drainage network extraction, catchment extraction, horton statistics etc.
3.3	3.3	September 2005	Georeferencing with additional supports up to 8 fiducial marks, sub-pixel precision and 3D coordinate transformations using 7 or 10 datum parameters.
3.3	3.3	September 2005	Import and export using the GDAL library.
3.3	3.3	September 2005	Projections for geostationary satellites.
3.3	3.3	September 2005	Calculation and statistical functions for map lists.
3.4	3.4 Open	July 1, 2007	GPL version from 52°North with proprietary components removed.
3.5	3.5	December 12, 2008	Introduction of plug-in system for applications. Started with the Geonetcast toolbox.
3.6	3.6	April 21, 2009	Refactoring of the whole vector system of Ilwis and with that a 25 new applications mainly, but not exclusively, about set operations on vector types. First implementation of the second generation Geonetcast toolbox.
3.7	3.7	March 25, 2010	Added number of new applications.
3.7	3.7.1	September 15, 2010	A number of bug fixes to ILWIS 3.7.
3.7	3.7.2	24 May 2011	A number of bug (from 3.7.1) fixes.
3.8	3.8	April 7, 2012	Massive rewrite of the whole visualization of maps. This rewrite expanded the tools for visual analysis substantially and improved the overall performance of the drawing process.
3.8	3.8.1	September 19, 2012	A number of bug fixes.
3.8	3.8.2	January 16, 2013	A number of bug (from 3.8.1) fixes as well as a few new features.
3.8	3.8.3	April 15, 2014	This release contains several bug (from 3.8.2) fixes as well as a few new features.
3.8	3.8.4	May 23, 2014	Several bug fixes, improvements and a few new features.
3.8	3.8.5	September 3, 2015	Several bug fixes, improvements and a few new features.
3.8	3.8.6	January 22, 2020	Several bug fixes, improvements and a few new features.

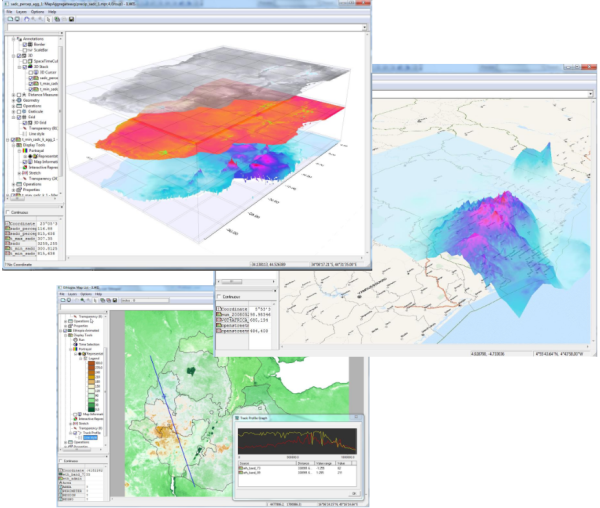
Layer visualization in ILWIS

== Features ==
ILWIS uses GIS techniques that integrate image processing capabilities, a tabular database and conventional GIS characteristics. The major features include:

- Integrated raster and vector design
- On-screen digitizing
- Comprehensive set of image processing and remote sensing tools like extensive set of filters, resampling, aggregation, classifications. etc...
- Orthophoto, image georeferencing, transformation and mosaicing
- Advanced modeling and spatial data analysis
- 3D visualization with interactive zooming, rotation and panning. "Height" information can be added from multiple types of sources and isn't limited to DEM information.
- Animations of spatial temporal data stacks with the possibility of synchronization between different animations.
- Rich map projection and geographic coordinate system library. Optionally custom coordinate systems and on the fly modifications can be added.
- Geostatistical analyses, with Kriging for improved interpolation
- Import and export using the GDAL/OGR library
- Advanced data management
- Stereoscopy tools - To create a stereo pair from two aerial photographs
- Transparencies at many levels (whole maps, selections, individual elements or properties) to combine different data sources in a comprehensive way.
- Various interactive diagramming options: Profile, Cross section visualization, Hovmoller diagrams
- Interactive value dependent presentation of maps (stretching, representation)
- Hydrologic Flow Operations
- Surface energy balance operations through the SEBS module
- GARtrip import - Map Import allows the import of GARtrip Text files with GPS data
- Spatial Multiple Criteria Evaluation (SMCE)
- Space time Cube. Interactive visualization of multiple attribute spatial temporal data.
- DEM operations including iso line generation
- Variable Threshold Computation, to help preparing a threshold map for drainage network extraction
- Horton Statistics, to calculate the number of streams, the average stream length, the average area of catchments for Strahler stream orders
- Georeference editors

== Roadmap ==
The next major version of Ilwis will be based on the Ilwis NG framework (in development). This framework aims at being a connection hub between various heterogeneous data and processing sources (local-remote). Integrating them in a consistent way and presenting them in a unified to the end users (at both programming and user interface level). The framework will be cross platform (ILWIS is now limited to Windows only) and will be deployable on mobile devices.

== See also ==
- List of GIS software
