= Plug-in (computing) =

Software component that extends the functionality of existing software

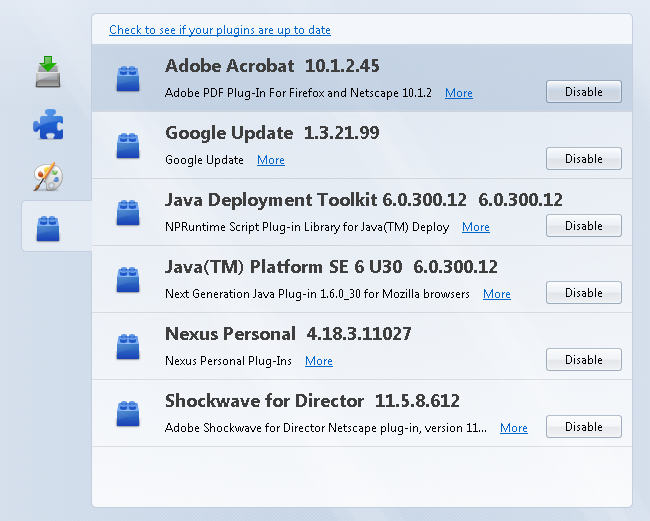
Mozilla Firefox displaying a list of installed plug-ins

In computing, a plug-in (also spelled plugin), add-in (also addin, add-on, or addon) or extension is a software component that extends the functionality of an existing software system without requiring the system to be re-built. A plug-in feature is one way that a system can be customizable.

Applications support plug-ins for a variety of reasons including:

- Enable third-party developers to extend an application
- Support easily adding new features
- Reduce the size of an application by not loading unused features
- Separate source code from an application because of incompatible software licenses

== Examples ==
Examples of plug-in use for various categories of applications:

- Digital audio workstations and audio editing software use audio plug-ins to generate, process or analyze sound. Ardour, Audacity, Cubase, FL Studio, Logic Pro X and Pro Tools are examples of such systems.
- Email clients use plug-ins to decrypt and encrypt email. Pretty Good Privacy is an example of such plug-ins.
- Video game console emulators often use plug-ins to modularize the separate subsystems of the devices they seek to emulate. For example, the PCSX2 emulator makes use of video, audio, optical, etc. plug-ins for those respective components of the PlayStation 2.
- Graphics software use plug-ins to support file formats and process images. A Photoshop plug-in may do this.
- Broadcasting and live-streaming software, like OBS Studio, as an open source software utilizes plug-ins for user-specific needs.
- Media players use plug-ins to support file formats and apply filters. foobar2000, GStreamer, Quintessential, VLC, Winamp, and XMMS are examples of such media players.
- Packet sniffers use plug-ins to decode packet formats. OmniPeek is an example of such packet sniffers.
- Remote sensing applications use plug-ins to process data from different sensor types; e.g., Opticks.
- Text editors and integrated development environments use plug-ins to support programming languages or enhance the development process, e.g., Visual Studio, RAD Studio, Eclipse, IntelliJ IDEA, jEdit and MonoDevelop support plug-ins. Visual Studio itself can be plugged into other applications via Visual Studio Tools for Office and Visual Studio Tools for Applications.
- Web browsers have historically used executables as plug-ins, though they all are deprecated. Examples include the Adobe Flash Player, a Java virtual machine (for Java applets), QuickTime, Microsoft Silverlight and the Unity Web Player. (Browser extensions, which are a separate type of installable module, are still widely in use.)

== Mechanism ==
Example Plug-In Framework

The host application provides services which the plug-in can use, including a way for plug-ins to register themselves with the host application and a protocol for the exchange of data with plug-ins. Plug-ins depend on the services provided by the host application and do not usually work by themselves. Conversely, the host application operates independently of the plug-ins, making it possible for end-users to add and update plug-ins dynamically without needing to make changes to the host application.

Programmers typically implement plug-ins as shared libraries, which get dynamically loaded at run time. HyperCard supported a similar facility, but more commonly included the plug-in code in the HyperCard documents (called stacks) themselves. Thus the HyperCard stack became a self-contained application in its own right, distributable as a single entity that end-users could run without the need for additional installation-steps. Programs may also implement plug-ins by loading a directory of simple script files written in a scripting language like Python or Lua.

== Helper application ==
How to install Calibre plugin.

In the context of a web browser, a helper application is a separate program—like IrfanView or Adobe Reader—that extends the functionality of a browser. A helper application extends the functionality an application but unlike the typical plug-in that is loaded into the host application's address space, a helper application is a separate application. With a separate address space, the extension cannot crash the host application as is possible if they share an address space.

== History ==
In the mid-1970s, the EDT text editor ran on the Unisys VS/9 operating system for the UNIVAC Series 90 mainframe computer. It allowed a program to be run from the editor, which can access the in-memory edit buffer. The plug-in executable could call the editor to inspect and change the text. The University of Waterloo Fortran compiler used this to allow interactive compilation of Fortran programs.

Early personal computer software with plug-in capability included HyperCard and QuarkXPress on the Apple Macintosh, both released in 1987. In 1988, Silicon Beach Software included plug-in capability in Digital Darkroom and SuperPaint.

== See also ==
- Add-on (Mozilla) – Software modules to extend Firefox web browsers
- Applet – Small software application
- Browser extension – Program that extends the functionality of a web browser
- Theme – Preset package containing graphical appearance and functionality details
