= World Urban Database and Access Portal Tools =

Set of tools used for climate zone maps

The World Urban Database and Access Portal Tools (WUDAPT) is a global initiative of tools to create local climate zone maps for a given city using a standard methodology. It has both a database and a portal. The database has hierarchical layers of increasing detail, with data acquired via crowdsourcing methods such as Geo-Wiki.

The framework was first introduced in a 2015 publication, which identified shortcomings in how climate and weather were mapped in urban areas. Despite accounting for about 3% of the Earth's land surface, urban areas account for a majority of the world's population. Additionally, cities are known to influence the local climate and weather, leading to the identification of the urban heat island effect. It was based on the National Urban Database and Access Portal Tool (NUDAPT), which was an initiative sponsored by the United States Environmental Protection Agency that initially hosted data for 33 US metropolitan areas, including building height, human population during both day and night, land surface temperature, radiation, and vegetation data. The WUDAPT has been used to create local climate zone maps for all of Europe and to analyze the spatial occurrence of heat waves in Guangdong, China.

== See also ==
- Advanced Spaceborne Thermal Emission and Reflection Radiometer (ASTER): freely available satellite imagery of Earth used to create detailed maps of surface temperature of land, emissivity, reflectance, and elevation
- List of GIS data sources
