= Land use, land-use change, and forestry =

Greenhouse gas inventory sector

The period since 1950 has brought "the most rapid transformation of the human relationship with the natural world in the history of humankind". Almost one-third of the world's forests, and almost two-thirds of its grassland, have been lost to human agriculture—which now occupies almost half the world's habitable land.

Land use, land-use change, and forestry (LULUCF), also referred to as forestry and other land use (FOLU) or agriculture, forestry and other land use (AFOLU), is defined as a "greenhouse gas inventory sector that covers emissions and removals of greenhouse gases resulting from direct human-induced land use such as settlements and commercial uses, land-use change, and forestry activities."

LULUCF has impacts on the global carbon cycle and as such, these activities can add or remove carbon dioxide (or, more generally, carbon) from the atmosphere, influencing climate. LULUCF has been the subject of two major reports by the Intergovernmental Panel on Climate Change (IPCC), but is difficult to measure. Additionally, land use is of critical importance for biodiversity.

== Development ==
The United Nations Framework Convention on Climate Change (UNFCCC) Article 4(1)(a) requires all Parties to "develop, periodically update, publish and make available to the Conference of the Parties" as well as "national inventories of anthropogenic emissions by sources" "removals by sinks of all greenhouse gases not controlled by the Montreal Protocol."

Under the UNFCCC reporting guidelines, human-induced greenhouse emissions must be reported in six sectors: energy (including stationary energy and transport); industrial processes; solvent and other product use; agriculture; waste; and land use, land use change and forestry (LULUCF).

The rules governing accounting and reporting of greenhouse gas emissions from LULUCF under the Kyoto Protocol are contained in several decisions of the Conference of Parties under the UNFCCC.

LULUCF has been the subject of two major reports by the Intergovernmental Panel on Climate Change (IPCC).

The Kyoto Protocol article 3.3 thus requires mandatory LULUCF accounting for afforestation (no forest for last 50 years), reforestation (no forest on 31 December 1989) and deforestation, as well as (in the first commitment period) under article 3.4 voluntary accounting for cropland management, grazing land management, revegetation and forest management (if not already accounted under article 3.3).

This decision sets out the rules that govern how Kyoto Parties with emission reduction commitments (so-called Annex 1 Parties) account for changes in carbon stocks in land use, land-use change and forestry. It is mandatory for Annex 1 Parties to account for changes in carbon stocks resulting from deforestation, reforestation and afforestation (B Article 3.3) and voluntary to account for emissions from forest management, cropland management, grazing land management and revegetation (B. Article 3.4). The flexibility mechanisms under the Kyoto Protocol, including the Clean Development Mechanism (CDM) and Joint Implementation (JI), also include provisions for LULUCF projects, further enhancing the integration of land use considerations into climate change mitigation strategies.

== Climate impacts ==
Per capita greenhouse gas emissions by country including land-use change, in the year 2000 according to World Resources Institute

Land-use change can be a factor in CO_{2} (carbon dioxide) atmospheric concentration, and is thus a contributor to global climate change. IPCC estimates that land-use change (e.g. conversion of forest into agricultural land) contributes a net 1.6 ± 0.8 Gt carbon per year to the atmosphere. For comparison, the major source of CO_{2}, namely emissions from fossil fuel combustion and cement production, amount to 6.3 ± 0.6 Gt carbon per year.

In 2021 the Global Carbon Project estimated annual land-use change emissions were 4.1 ± 2.6 Gt CO_{2} (CO_{2} not carbon: 1 Gt carbon = 3.67 Gt CO_{2}) for 2011–2020.

Updated assessments report that emissions from land-use, land-use change and forestry averaged 1.1 ± 0.7 Gt C yr⁻¹ (4.1 ± 2.6 Gt CO₂ yr⁻¹) over 2014–2023 and a preliminary projection of 1.2 ± 0.7 Gt C yr⁻¹ (4.2 ± 2.6 Gt CO₂ yr⁻¹) for 2024

The land-use sector is critical to achieving the aim of the Paris Agreement to limit global warming to 2 °C (3.6 °F).

Land-use change alters not just atmospheric CO_{2} concentration but also land surface biophysics such as albedo and evapotranspiration, both of which affect climate. The impact of land-use change on the climate is also more and more recognized by the climate modeling community. On regional or local scales, the impact of LUC can be assessed by Regional climate models (RCMs). This is however difficult, particularly for variables, which are inherently noisy, such as precipitation. For this reason, it is suggested to conduct RCM ensemble simulations.

== Extents and mapping ==
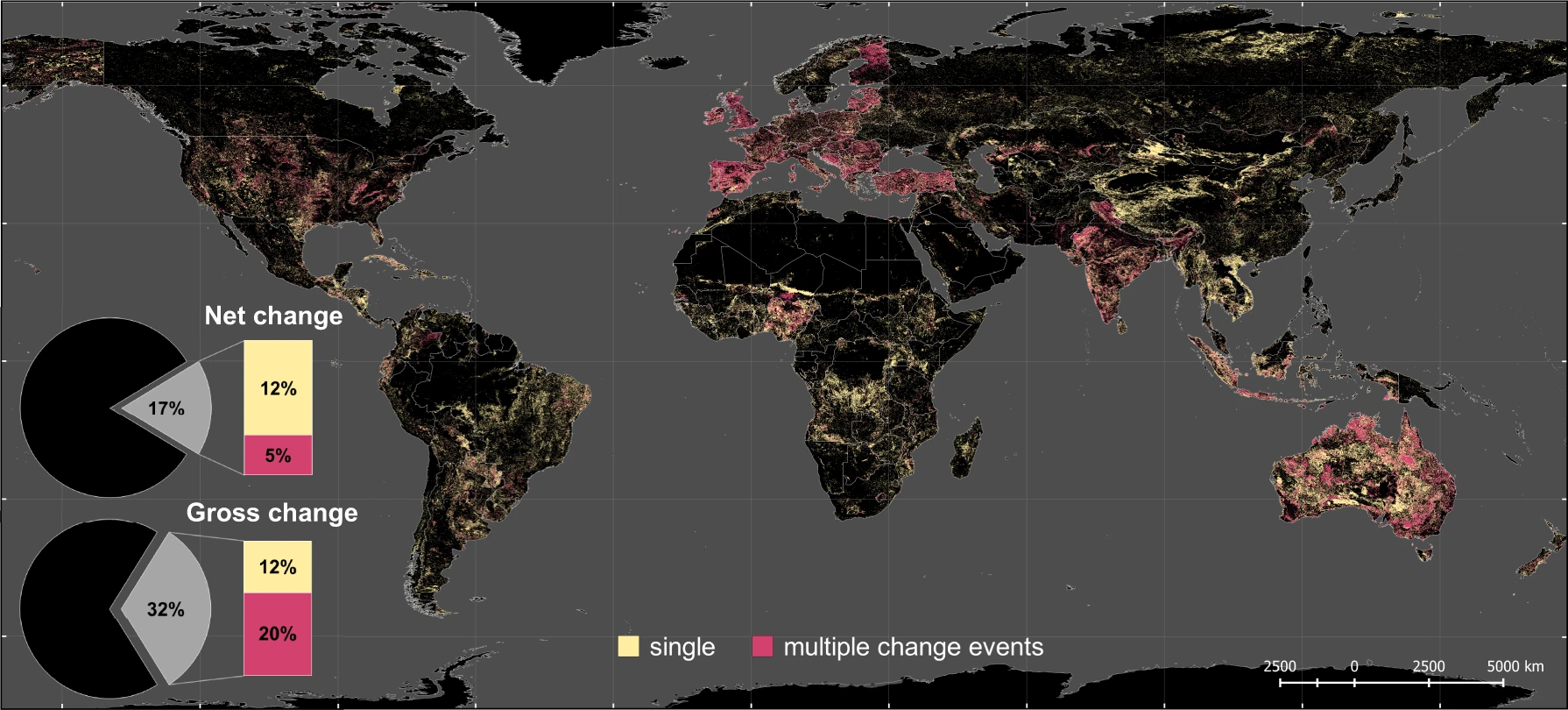
Share of the total land surface without and with consideration of multiple changes between six major land use/cover categories (urban area, cropland, pasture/rangeland, forest, unmanaged grass/shrubland, non-/sparsely vegetated land) in 1960–2019.

A 2021 study estimated, with higher resolution data, that land-use change has affected 17% of land in 1960–2019, or when considering multiple change events 32%, "around four times" previous estimates. They also investigate its drivers, identifying global trade affecting agriculture as a main driver.

== Forest modeling ==
Earth system modeling has traditionally been used to analyze forests for climate projections. However, in recent years, there has been a shift away from this modeling towards more mitigation and adaptation projections. These projections can give researchers a better understanding of future forest management practices to employ. Furthermore, this new modeling approach also allows for land management practices to be analyzed in the model. Land management practices include forest harvest, tree species selection, grazing, and crop harvest. Land management practices produce biophysical and biogeochemical effects on the forest, and following the model can increase the likelihood of success. Where there is a lack of available data for these practices, further monitoring and data collecting are needed to improve the models' accuracy.

A National forest monitoring system can provide inputs for land-use greenhouse-gas inventories prepared using Intergovernmental Panel on Climate Change methods, including combining mapped area change with emission or removal factors to estimate emissions and removals associated with forest land.

== See also ==
- Agricultural expansion – Growth of agricultural land in the 21st century
- Deforestation and climate change
- Land change science – Interdisciplinary study of changes in climate, land use, and land cover
- Land change modeling – Geographic and ecological field of study
- Land use – Classification of land resources based on what can be built and on its use
- Satoyama – Japanese term for the area between flat coastal plains and interior mountain foothills
- Special Report on Climate Change and Land – IPCC report
