= Heejun Chang =

Korean Academic geographer

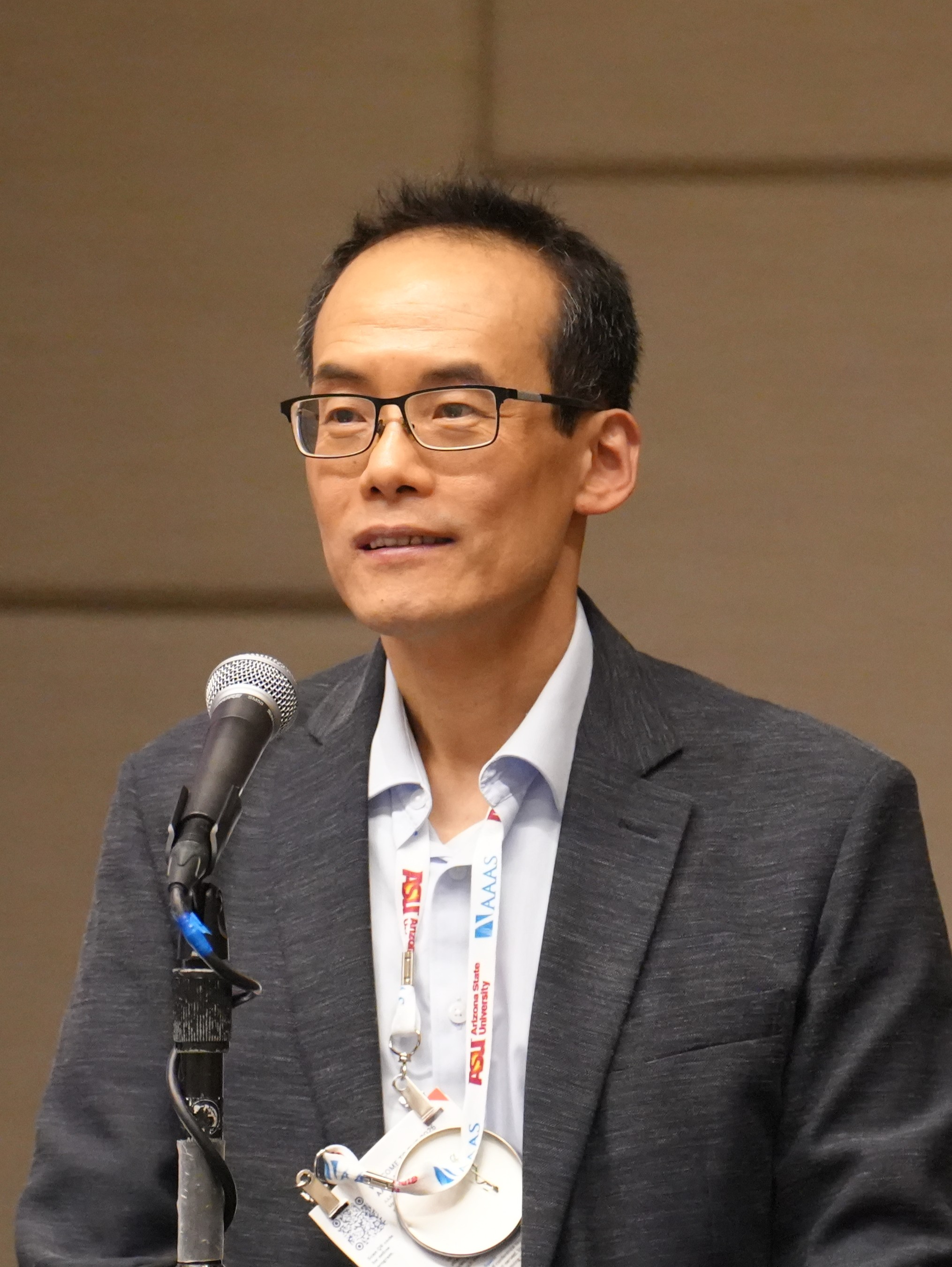
- Education: Seoul National University Pennsylvania State University
- Occupation: Professor

Heejun Chang is a professor of geography and associate dean for research and graduate programs at Portland State University.

== Early life and education ==
He holds a BA and an MA from Seoul National University and obtained a PhD from the Pennsylvania State University. His research and teaching focus on water sustainability in a changing climate, land cover, and management. Chang has been leading transdisciplinary water research from a coupled natural and human system lens.

== Career ==
He is a professor of Geography specializing in Hydrology and Water Resources at the Department of Geography of PSU. He has served as the Willamette River basin representative of the UNESCO-HELP (Hydrology, Environment, Life and Policy) program. Chang also served as a lead author of the freshwater section of the 1st Oregon Climate Assessment Report. He is the current editor of the Professional Geographer, published by Taylor & Francis on behalf of the American Association of Geographers. Chang is dedicated to investigating water sustainability in a changing climate, land cover, management, and has been leading transdisciplinary water research from a coupled natural and human system lens. He is a Fellow of the Institute for Sustainable Solutions and the past Chair of the Spatial and Analysis and Modeling Specialty Group of the American Association of Geographers. Chang is the past president of the Korea-America Geospatial and Environmental Scientists Association.

Chang's areas of research interest include impacts of climate change on regional water resources, land cover change and water quality, floods and droughts, and water-related ecosystem services. His research has been funded by US National Science Foundation, National Oceanic and Atmospheric Administration, US Environmental Protection Agency, US Forest Service, US Department of Agriculture, US Geological Survey, US Army Corps of Engineers, and Korea Ministry of Science and Education. He was an invited keynote speaker for the science and practice of flood disaster management in urbanizing Monsoon Asia in 2007. Chang has collaborated with the City of Vernonia, City of Portland, and Metro, a regional government in the Portland metropolitan area, in studying future climate change impacts on urban floods using social surveys and process-based modeling. He has collaborated with the City of Portland on the Willamette River flooding under sea-level rise and flow increase scenarios. Sponsored by the Social Science Research Council/Abe foundation, his recent work also includes urban flood resilience in US, Japan, and South Korean cities. Chang has authored and served as a reviewer of more than 80 geographical, hydrologic, and environmental studies journals as well as numerous national and international grants. He has co-authored more than 170 peer-reviewed journal articles and book chapters, and his work has been cited more than 9000 times by google scholar with an H index of 55.

He has guided more than 30 graduate students till date. Chang is in the Reuters Hot List of the world's top 1000 climate scientists.
