= Land change science =

Interdisciplinary study of changes in climate, land use, and land cover

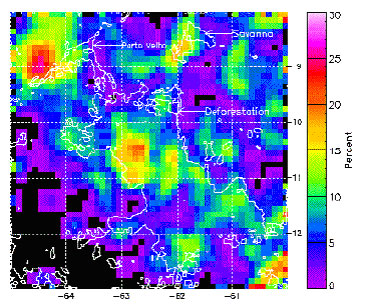
Effects of deforestation in Brazil on rainfall taken from a NASA study

Land change science refers to the interdisciplinary study of changes in climate, land use, and land cover. Land change science specifically seeks to evaluate patterns, processes, and consequences in changes in land use and cover over time. The purpose of land change science is to contribute to existing knowledge of climate change and to the development of sustainable resource management and land use policy. The field is informed by a number of related disciplines, such as remote sensing, landscape ecology, and political ecology, and uses a broad range of methods to evaluate the patterns and processes that underlie land cover change. Land change science addresses land use as a coupled human-environment system to understand the impacts of interconnected environmental and social issues, including deforestation and urbanization.

== History ==
Land change science is a recently developed field, which emerged in conjunction with the advancement of climate change and global environmental change research, and is important to the evolution of climate change science and adaptation. It is both problem-oriented and interdisciplinary. In the mid-20th century, human-environment relationships were emerging in areas of study such as anthropology and geography. Some scholars assert that the discipline of land change science is loosely derived from German concepts of landscape as the total amount of things within a given territory. In the latter half of the 20th century, scientists studying cultural ecology and risk-assessment ecology worked to develop land change science as a means of addressing land as a human-environment system that can be understood as a foundation of global environmental science.

== Aims ==
Thus far, the aims of land change science have been to:

1. Observe and monitor land changes underway throughout the world
2. Understand land change as a human-environmental system
3. Model land change
4. Assess system outcomes such as vulnerability, sustainability, and resilience

== Related disciplines ==
Land change science is an interdisciplinary field, and thus is influenced by a number of related areas of study, including remote sensing, political ecology, resource economics, landscape ecology, and biogeography. It is meant to supplement the study of climate change, and through the examination of land cover and land use changes in conjunction with climatic changes over the same period of time, scientists can better understand how human land use practices contribute to a changing climate. Given its close association with the study of climate change, land change science is inherently sustainability research and the scientific knowledge it produces is used to influence the development of sustainable agriculture, and sustainable land use practices and policies.

Although land change science involves quantifying the location, extent, and variability of land change cover and the analysis of emergent patterns, it remains fundamentally interdisciplinary, including social and economic components.

== Methods ==
Land change science mainly operates within the international scientific research frameworks from which its fundamental questions were developed. Although the field has ties to social and cultural studies in its understanding of land and land change as a human-environment system, land change science also focuses on ecosystems and earth systems' structure, function, and effects on land change, independent of human activity. Land change science encompasses a broad scope of dimensions, ranging from quantifying the ecological effects of land cover change, to understanding the socio-environmental drivers for land-use decisions at an institutional level. As a result, land change science relies on the synthesis of a wide range of data and a diverse range of data collection methods. These include for example land cover monitoring and assessments, modeling risk and vulnerability, and land change modeling.

== Challenges ==
Land change science as a discipline faces several challenges, many of the stemming from its interdisciplinary qualities or issues with developing inferences using aggregate data. For example, land change science is limited by constraints on data and lack of understanding of underlying issues of land change. Specifically, the spatial models frequently used to study land change may restricted by lack of access to public data on land change, faulty sensors, and high levels of variable uncertainty. Thus, models are often only able to make short-term projections, which severely limits the level of prediction they can provide. Additionally, it is difficult to synthesize and combine the case studies of social-environmental systems that are essential to the study of land change on a global scale. Thus, these setbacks pose fundamental challenges to the connection of communities and environment that land change science seeks to achieve.

== See also ==
- Climate Change Science Program – US Climate Change organization
- Land use, land-use change, and forestry – Greenhouse gas inventory sector
- Land development – Landscape alteration
- Land degradation – Gradual destruction of land
- Soil degradation – Two processes associated with loss of stable soil equilibrium
