= Land use =

Classification of land resources based on what can be built and on its use

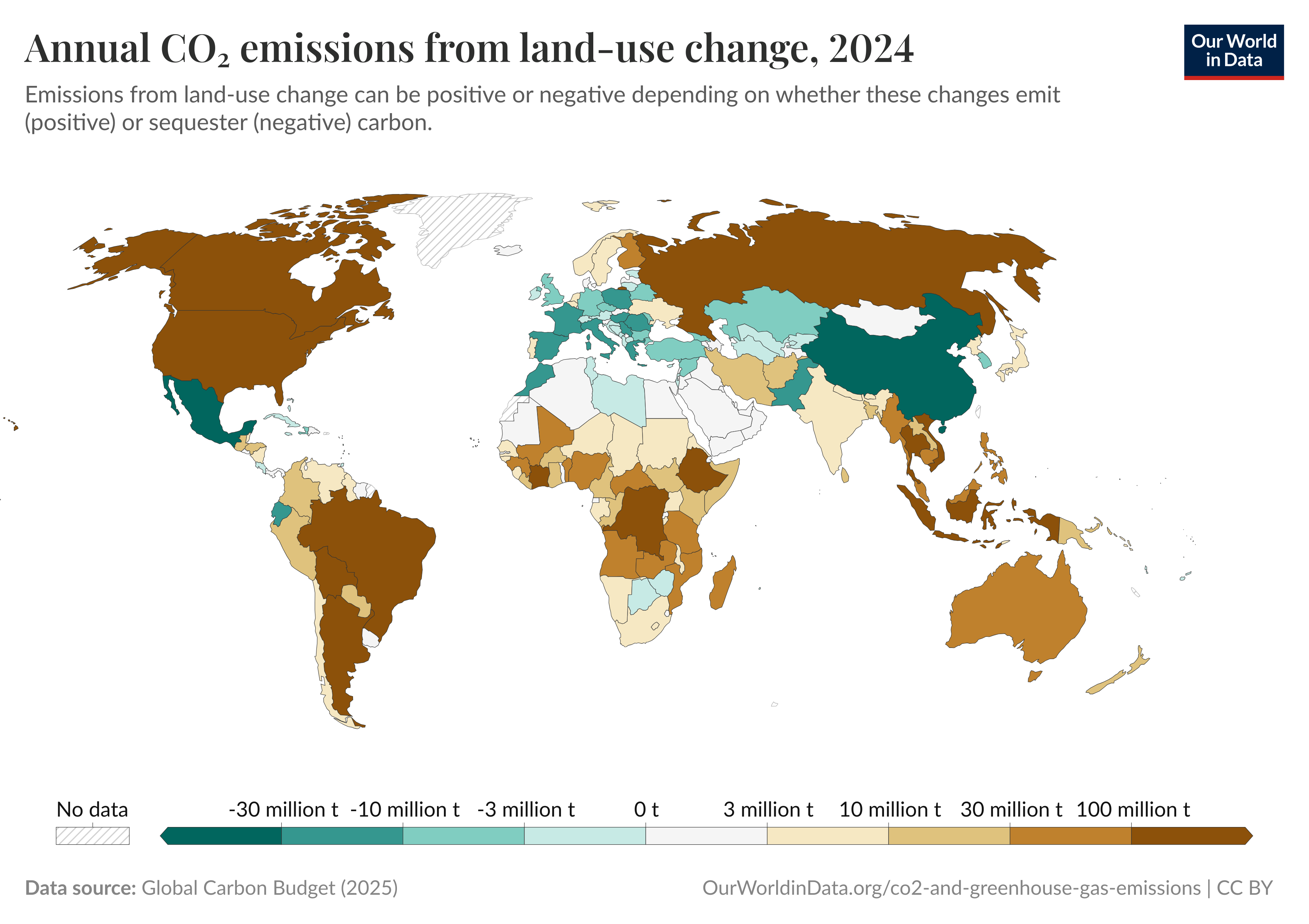
Annual CO2 emissions from land-use change in 2024. Emissions from land-use change can be positive or negative depending on whether these changes emit (positive, brown on the map) or sequester (negative) carbon (green on the map).

Land use, land cover, or land use/land cover (LU/LC) is a description of what happens on a parcel of land. It concerns the benefits derived from using the land, and also the land management actions that humans carry out there. The following categories are used for land use: forest land, cropland (agricultural land), grassland, wetlands, settlements and other lands. The way humans use land, and how land use is changing, has many impacts on the environment. Effects of land use choices and changes by humans include, for example, urban sprawl, soil erosion, soil degradation, land degradation and desertification. Land use and land management practices have a major impact on natural resources including water, soil, nutrients, plants and animals.

Land use change is "the change from one land-use category to another". Land-use change, together with use of fossil fuels, are the major anthropogenic sources of carbon dioxide, a dominant greenhouse gas. Human activity is the most significant cause of land cover change, and humans are also directly impacted by the environmental consequences of these changes. For example, deforestation (the systematic and permanent conversion of previously forested land for other uses) has historically been a primary facilitator of land use and land cover change.

The study of land change relies on the synthesis of a wide range of data and a diverse range of data collection methods. These include land cover monitoring and assessments, modeling risk and vulnerability, and land change modeling.

== Definition and categories ==
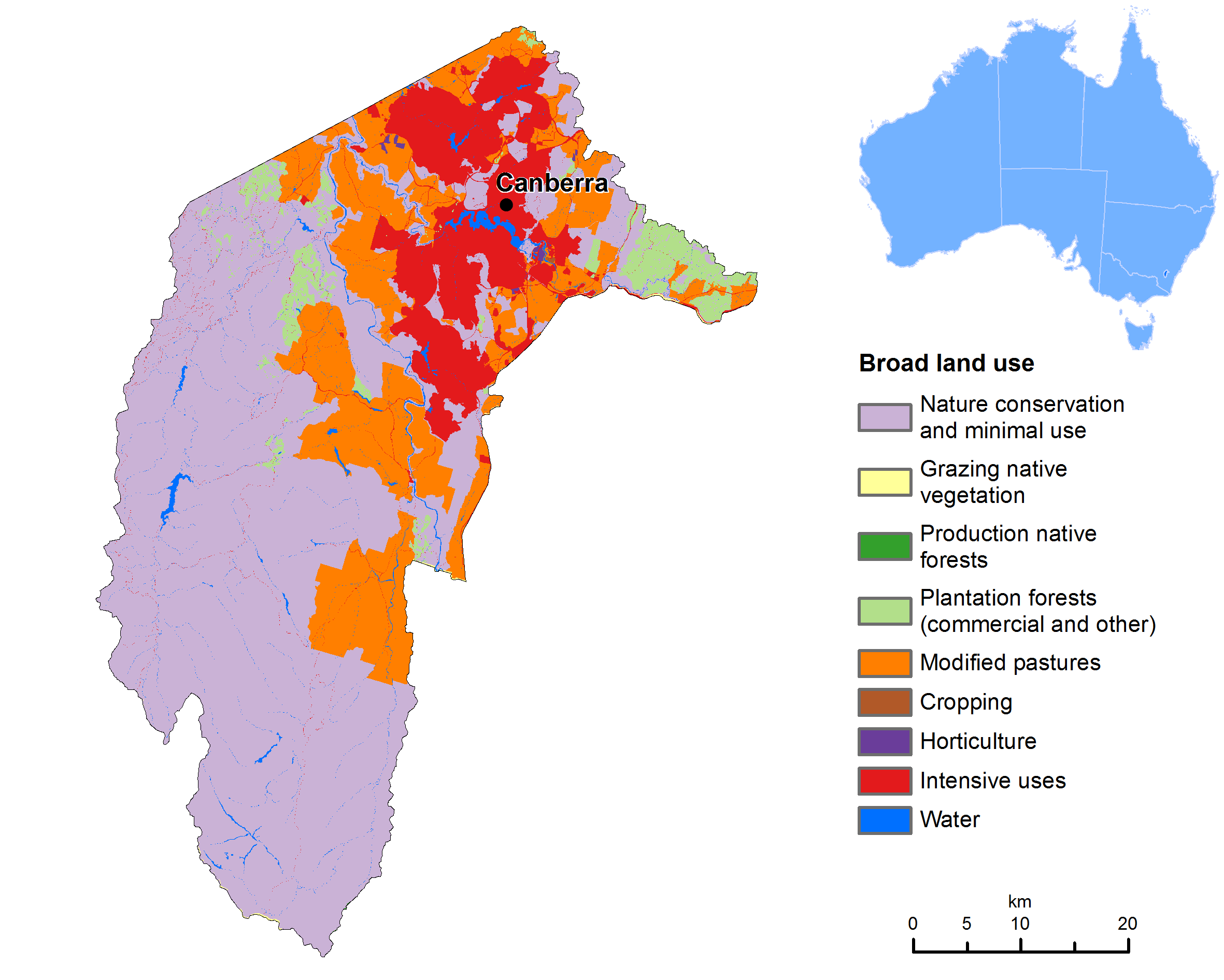
A graphic description of land use in the Australian Capital Territory as of 2017. Colours represent different uses.

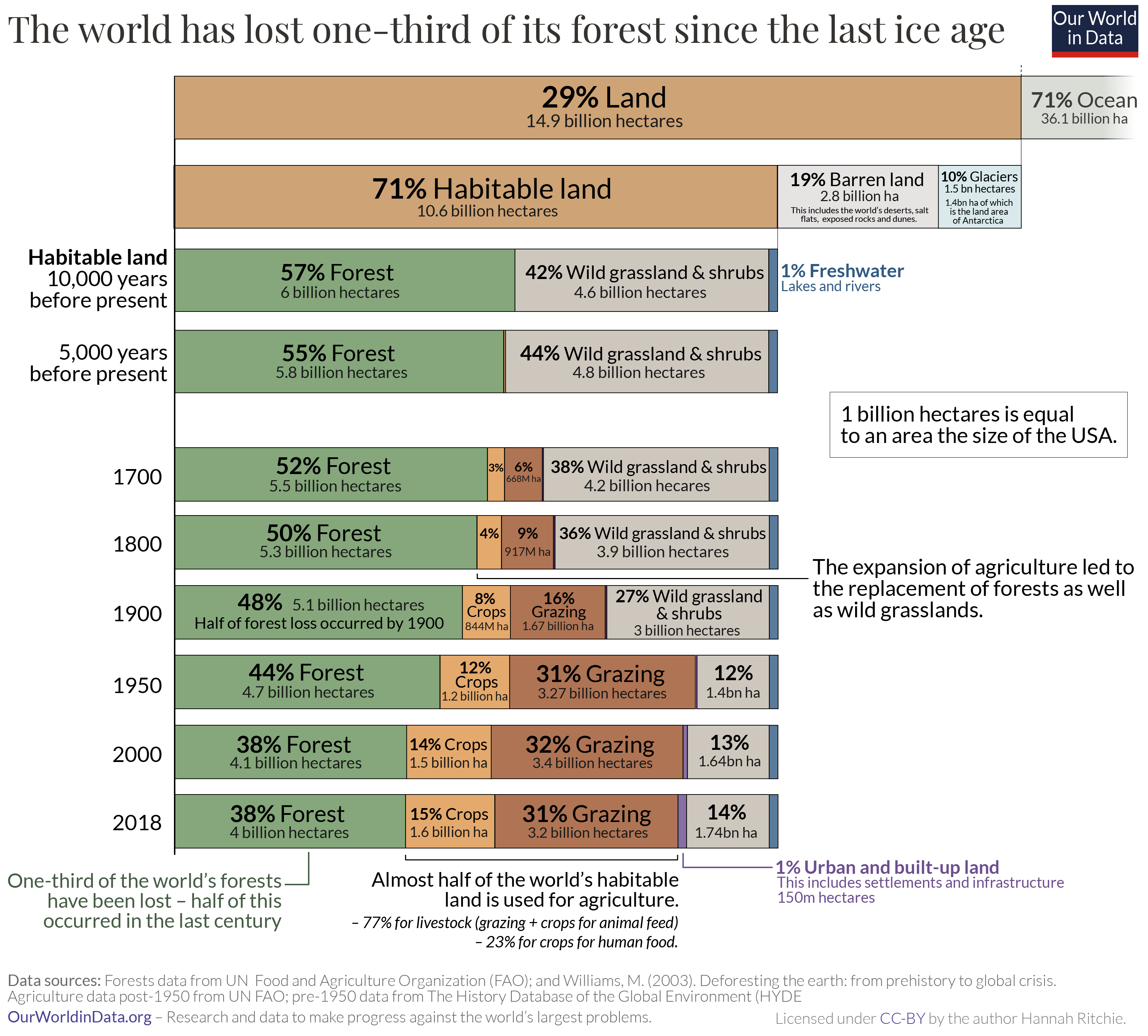
The development of global land use over the centuries and millennia: more and more of the world's habitable land is used for agriculture.

The IPCC defines the term land use as the "total of arrangements, activities and inputs applied to a parcel of land". The same report groups land use into the following categories: forest land, cropland (agricultural land), grassland, wetlands, settlements and other lands.

Another definition is that of the United Nations' Food and Agriculture Organization: "Land use concerns the products and/or benefits obtained from use of the land as well as the land management actions (activities) carried out by humans to produce those products and benefits."

As of the early 1990s, about 13% of the Earth was considered arable land, with 26% in pasture, 32% forests and woodland, and 1.5% urban areas.

As of 2015, the total arable land is 10.7% of the land surface, with 1.3% being permanent cropland.

For example, the US Department of Agriculture has identified six major types of land use in the United States. Acreage statistics for each type of land use in the contiguous 48 states in 2017 were as follows:

US land use (2017)
Use	acreage (M)	km^{2} (M)	% of total
Pasture/range	654	2.647	35
Forest	538.6	2.18	28
Cropland	391.5	1.584	21
Special use	168.8	0.683	9
Miscellaneous	68.9	0.279	4
Urban	69.4	0.281	4
Total	1,891	7.653	100

Special use areas in the table above include national parks (29 M acres) and state parks (15 M), wildlife areas (64.4 M), highways (21 M), railroads (3M), military bases (25 M), airports (3M) and a few others. Miscellaneous includes cemeteries, golf courses, marshes, deserts, and other areas of "low economic value". The total land area of the United States is 9.1 M km^{2} but the total used here refers only to the contiguous 48 states, without Alaska etc.

== Land use change ==
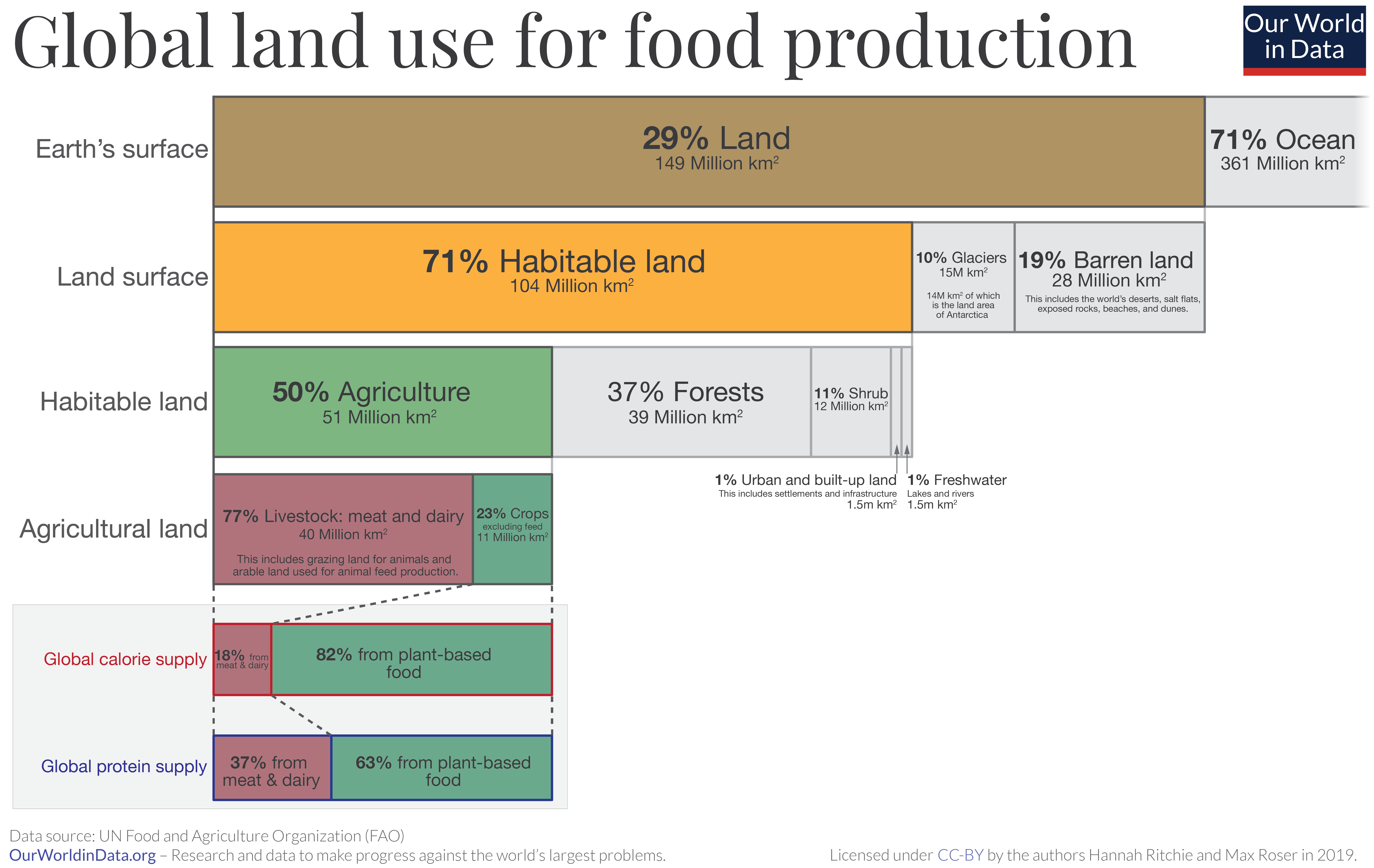
Global distribution of land used for agriculture

Components of the world's land use and net changes, 2001–2023.

Land use change is "the change from one land-use category to another". Land-use change, together with use of fossil fuels, are the major anthropogenic sources of carbon dioxide, a dominant greenhouse gas.

Human activity is the most significant cause of land cover change, and humans are also directly impacted by the environmental consequences of these changes. Collective land use and land cover changes have fundamentally altered the functioning of key Earth systems. For instance, human changes to land use and land cover have a profound impact on climate at a local and regional level, which in turn contributes to climate change.

Land use by humans has a long history, first emerging more than 10,000 years ago. Human changes to land surfaces have been documented for centuries as having significant impacts on both earth systems and human well-being. Deforestation is an example of large-scale land use change. The deforestation of temperate regions since 1750 has had a major effect on land cover. The reshaping of landscapes to serve human needs, such as the deforestation for farmland, can have long-term effects on earth systems and exacerbate the causes of climate change.

Land is the foundation of agriculture, supporting over 95% of food production while providing essential ecosystem services that sustain life on Earth. As a finite resource, it faces pressures from competing demands including urban expansion, biofuel production, and changing consumption patterns driven by rising incomes and shifting diets. Land is the basis of food security, biodiversity conservation, climate regulation and in 2025 the livelihoods of 892 million agricultural workers worldwide.

The expansion of agriculture has fundamentally transformed land-use patterns across the planet over the centuries. In the twenty-first century, between 2001 and 2023, global agricultural area decreased by 78 million hectares (Mha) (−2%), with cropland area increasing by 78 Mha and permanent meadows and pastures decreasing by 151 Mha. These changes exhibit significant regional variations. Sub-Saharan Africa witnessed cropland expansion of 69 Mha accompanied by 72 Mha of forest loss, while Latin America saw 25 Mha of cropland growth alongside 85 Mha of net forest area loss. Agricultural expansion remains the primary driver of global deforestation, accounting for nearly 90% of forest loss. In this century, another important aspect to consider is that approximately 3.6 Mha of croplands are abandoned annually, with land degradation likely playing a significant role in these losses.

Although the burning of fossil fuels is the primary driver of present-day climate change, prior to the Industrial Revolution, deforestation and irrigation were the largest sources of human-driven greenhouse gas emissions. Even today, 35% of anthropogenic carbon dioxide contributions can be attributed to land use or land cover changes. Currently, almost 50% of Earth's non-ice land surface has been transformed by human activities, with approximately 40% of that land used for agriculture, surpassing natural systems as the principal source of nitrogen emissions.

Increasing land conversion by humans in future is not inevitable: In a discussion on response options to climate change mitigation and adaptation an IPCC special report stated that "a number of response options such as increased food productivity, dietary choices and food losses, and waste reduction, can reduce demand for land conversion, thereby potentially freeing land and creating opportunities for enhanced implementation of other response options".

== Analytical methods ==
Land change science relies heavily on the synthesis of a wide range of data and a diverse range of data collection methods, some of which are detailed below.

=== Land cover monitoring and assessments ===
A primary function of land change science is to document and model long-term patterns of landscape change, which may result from both human activity and natural processes. In the course of monitoring and assessing land cover and land use changes, scientists look at several factors, including where land-cover and land-use are changing, the extent and timescale of changes, and how changes vary through time. To this end, scientists use a variety of tools, including satellite imagery and other sources of remotely sensed data (e.g., aircraft imagery), field observations, historical accounts, and reconstruction modeling. These tools, particularly satellite imagery, allow land change scientists to accurately monitor land-change rates and create a consistent, long-term record to quantify change variability over time. Through observing patterns in land cover changes, scientists can determine the consequences of these changes, predict the impact of future changes, and use this information to inform strategic land management.

=== Modeling risk and vulnerability ===
Modeling risk and vulnerability is also one of land change science's practical applications. Accurate predictions of how human activity will influence land cover change over time, as well as the impact that such changes have on the sustainability of ecological and human systems, can inform the creation of policy designed to address these changes.

Studying risk and vulnerability entails the development of quantitative, qualitative, and geospatial models, methods, and support tools. The purpose of these tools is to communicate the vulnerability of both human communities and natural ecosystems to hazard events or long-term land change. Modeling risk and vulnerability requires analyses of community sensitivity to hazards, an understanding of geographic distributions of people and infrastructure, and accurate calculation of the probability of specific disturbances occurring.

=== Land change modeling ===
A key method for studying risk and vulnerability is land change modeling (LCM), which can be used to simulate changes and land use and land cover. LCMs can be used to predict how land use and land cover may change under alternate circumstances, which is useful for risk assessment, in that it allows for the prediction of potential impacts and can be used to inform policy decisions, albeit with some uncertainty.

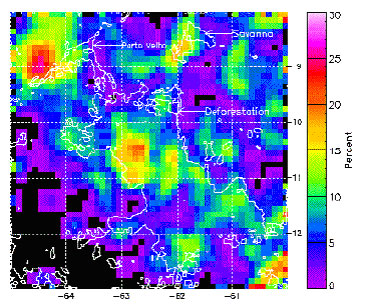
Predicting the effects of deforestation on rainfall in Brazil, an example of land change modeling.

Land change models (LCMs) describe, project, and explain changes in and the dynamics of land use and land-cover. LCMs are a means of understanding ways that humans change the Earth's surface in the past, present, and future.

Land change models are valuable in development policy, helping guide more appropriate decisions for resource management and the natural environment at a variety of scales ranging from a small piece of land to the entire spatial extent. Moreover, developments within land-cover, environmental and socio-economic data (as well as within technological infrastructures) have increased opportunities for land change modeling to help support and influence decisions that affect human-environment systems, as national and international attention increasingly focuses on issues of global climate change and sustainability.

== Examples of land use change ==
=== Deforestation ===
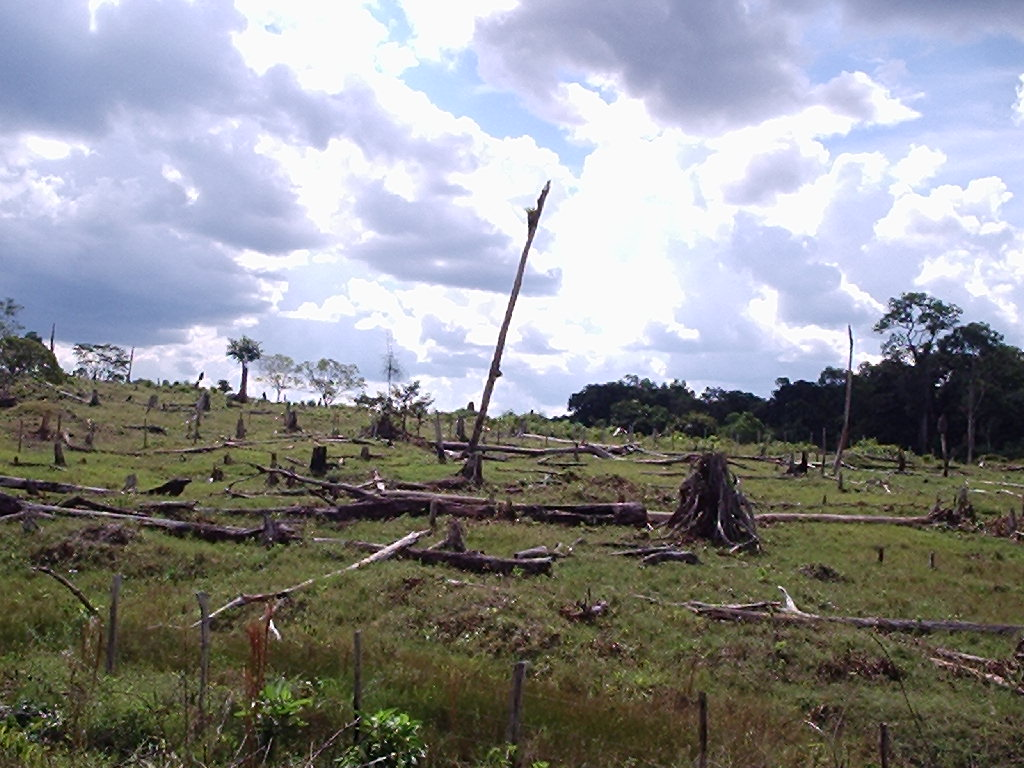
Rainforest deforestation for land use conversion

Deforestation is the systematic and permanent conversion of previously forested land for other uses. It has historically been a primary facilitator of land use and land cover change. Forests are a vital part of the global ecosystem and are essential to carbon capture, ecological processes, and biodiversity. However, since the invention of agriculture, global forest cover has diminished by 35%.

There is rarely one direct or underlying cause for deforestation. Rather, deforestation is the result of intertwining systemic forces working simultaneously or sequentially to change land cover. Deforestation occurs for many interconnected reasons. For instance, mass deforestation is often viewed as the product of industrial agriculture, yet a considerable portion old-growth forest deforestation is the result of small-scale migrant farming. As forest cover is removed, forest resources become exhausted and increasing populations lead to scarcity, which prompts people to move again to previously undisturbed forest, restarting the process of deforestation. There are several reasons behind this continued migration: poverty-driven lack of available farmland and high costs may lead to an increase in farming intensity on existing farmland. This leads to the overexploitation of farmland, and down the line results in desertification, another land cover change, which renders soil unusable and unprofitable, requiring farmers to seek out untouched and unpopulated old-growth forests.

In addition to rural migration and subsistence farming, economic development can also play a substantial role in deforestation. For example, road and railway expansions designed to increase quality of life have resulted in significant deforestation in the Amazon and Central America. Moreover, the underlying drivers of economic development are often linked to global economic engagement, ranging from increased exports to a foreign debt.

=== Urbanization ===
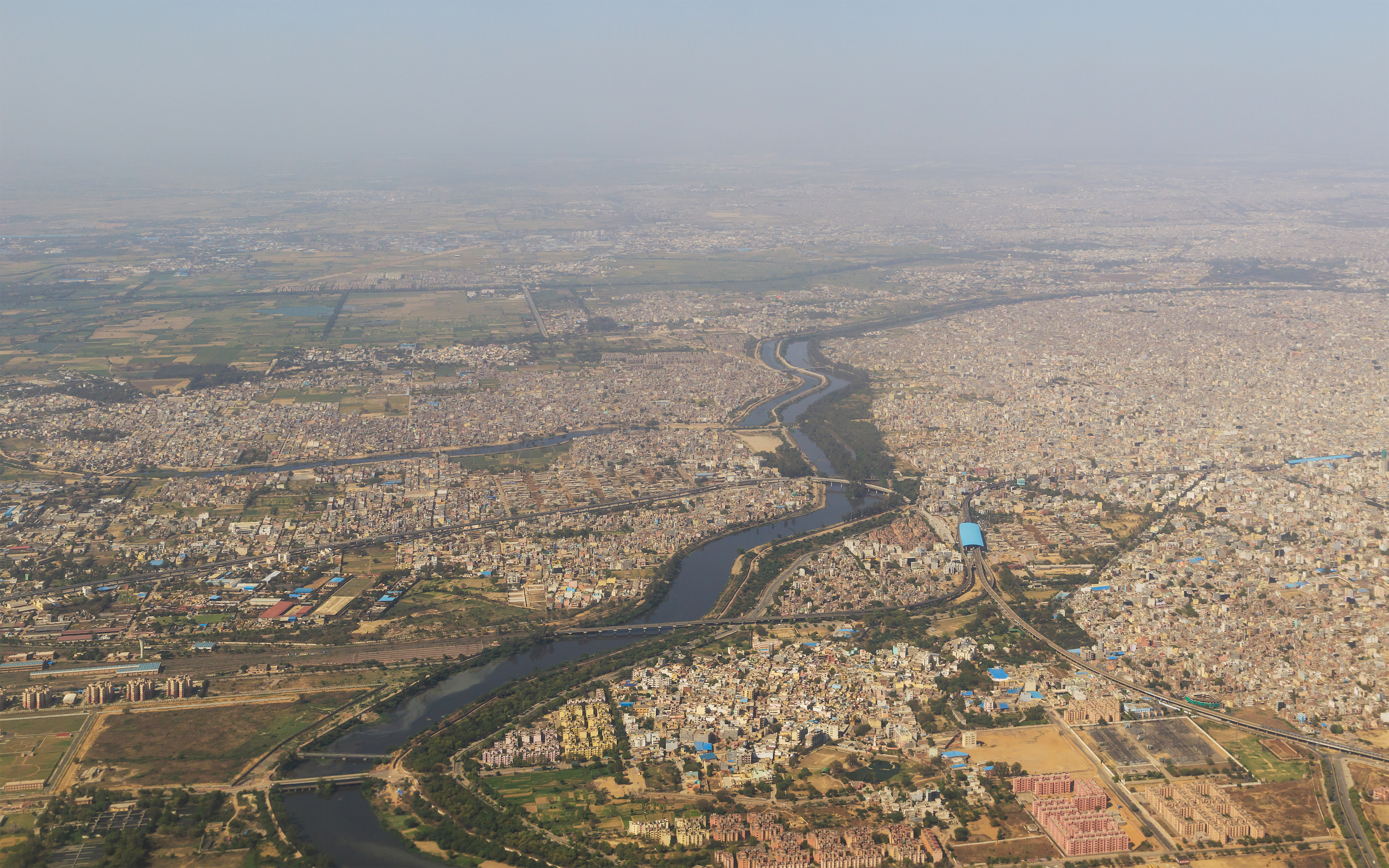
An aerial image of New Delhi, India, one of the world's largest urban areas

Broadly, urbanization is the increasing number of people who live in urban areas. Urbanization refers to both urban population growth and the physical growth of urban areas. According to the United Nations, the global urban population has increased rapidly since 1950, from 751 million to 4.2 billion in 2018, and current trends predict this number will continue to grow. Accompanying this population shift are significant changes in economic flow, culture and lifestyle, and spatial population distribution. Although urbanized areas cover just 3% of the Earth's surface, they nevertheless have a significant impact on land use and land cover change.

Urbanization is important to land use and land cover change for a variety of reasons. In particular, urbanization affects land change elsewhere through the shifting of urban-rural linkages, or the ecological footprint of the transfer of goods and services between urban and rural areas. Increases in urbanization lead to increases in consumption, which puts increased pressure on surrounding rural lands. The outward spread of urban areas can also take over adjacent land formerly used for crop cultivation.

Urbanization additionally affects land cover through the urban heat island effect. Heat islands occur when, due to high concentrations of structures, such as buildings and roads, that absorb and re-emit solar radiation, and low concentrations of vegetative cover, urban areas experience higher temperatures than surrounding areas. The high temperatures associated with heat islands can compromise human health, particularly in low-income areas.

=== Decline of the Aral Sea ===
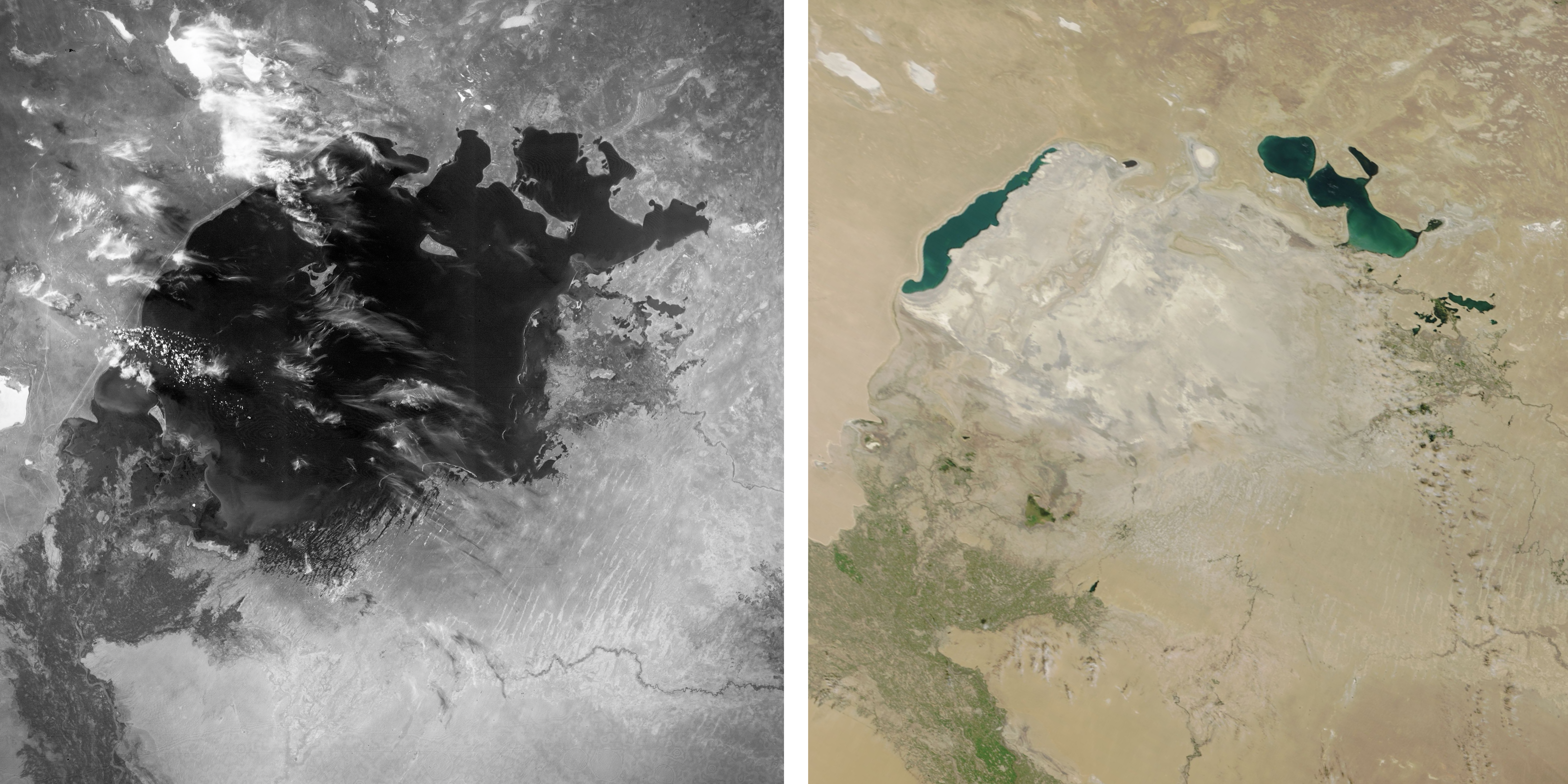
Remote sensing images show changes to the extent of the Aral Sea from 1964 (left) to 2026 (right).

The rapid decline of the Aral Sea is an example how local-scale land use and land change can have compounded impacts on regional climate systems, particularly when human activities heavily disrupt natural climatic cycles, how land change science can be used to map and study such changes. In 1960, the Aral Sea, located in Central Asia, was the world's fourth largest lake. However, a water diversion project, undertaken by the Soviet Union to irrigate arid plains in what is now Kazakhstan, Uzbekistan, and Turkmenistan, resulted in the Aral Sea losing 85% of its land cover and 90% of its volume. The loss of the Aral Sea has had a significant effect on human-environment interactions in the region, including the decimation of the sea's fishing industry and the salinization of agricultural lands by the wind-spread of dried sea salt beds.

Additionally, scientists have been able to use technology such as NASA's Moderate Resolution Imaging Spectroradiometer (MODIS) to track changes to the Aral Sea and its surrounding climate over time. This use of modeling and satellite imagery to track human-caused land cover change is characteristic of the scope of land change science.

== Regulation ==
Commonly, political jurisdictions will undertake land-use planning and regulate the use of land in an attempt to avoid land-use conflicts. Land use plans are implemented through land division and use ordinances and regulations, such as zoning regulations.

The urban growth boundary is one form of land-use regulation. For example, Portland, Oregon is required to have an urban growth boundary which contains at least 20,000 acres (81 km^{2}) of vacant land. Additionally, Oregon restricts the development of farmland. The regulations are controversial, but an economic analysis concluded that farmland appreciated similarly to the other land.

=== United States ===
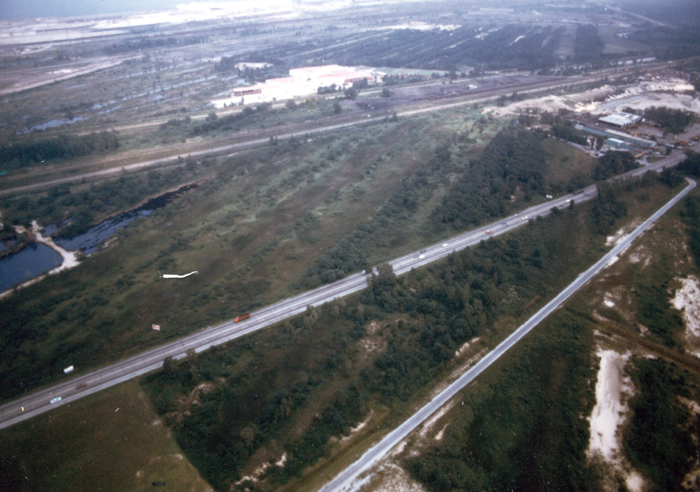
Habitat fragmentation caused by numerous roads near the Indiana Dunes National Lakeshore

In colonial America, few regulations were originally put into place regarding the usage of land. As society shifted from rural to urban, public land regulation became important, especially to city governments trying to control industry, commerce, and housing within their boundaries. The first zoning ordinance was passed in New York City in 1916, and, by the 1930s, most states had adopted zoning laws. In the 1970s, concerns about the environment and historic preservation led to further regulation.

Today, federal, state, and local governments regulate growth and development through statutory law. The majority of controls on land, however, stem from the actions of private developers and individuals. Judicial decisions and enforcement of private land-use arrangements can reinforce public regulation, and achieve forms and levels of control that regulatory zoning cannot. There is growing concern that land use regulation is a direct cause of housing segregation in the United States today.

Two major federal laws passed in the 1960s limit the use of land significantly. These are the National Historic Preservation Act of 1966 (today embodied in 16 U.S.C. 461 et seq.) and the National Environmental Policy Act of 1969 (42 U.S.C. 4321 et seq.).

== See also ==
- Cultural landscape – Landscape, which is permanently embossed by humans
- Land use, land-use change and forestry – Greenhouse gas inventory sector
- Land-use forecasting – Model used as input to the transportation planning process
- Indirect land use change impacts of biofuels – Negative spillover effect of production of biofuels
- Land change modeling – Geographic and ecological field of study
- Land-use planning – Process of regulating the use of land by a central authority
- Land-use conflict

== Sources ==
This article incorporates text from a free content work. Licensed under CC BY 4.0 (license statement/permission). Text taken from The State of Food and Agriculture 2025, Food and Agriculture Organization of the United Nations.
