= J. Ronald Eastman =

Dr. J. Ronald Eastman is a professor of geography at Clark University and the author and chief developer of IDRISI GIS Software. At Clark he teaches the class Advanced Topics in GIS. In 2003, Eastman received the Ronald F. Abler Distinguished Service Honors from the Association of American Geographers (AAG). Eastman was awarded the Distinguished Career Award at the 2010 Annual AAG Meeting.
