= OpenEV =

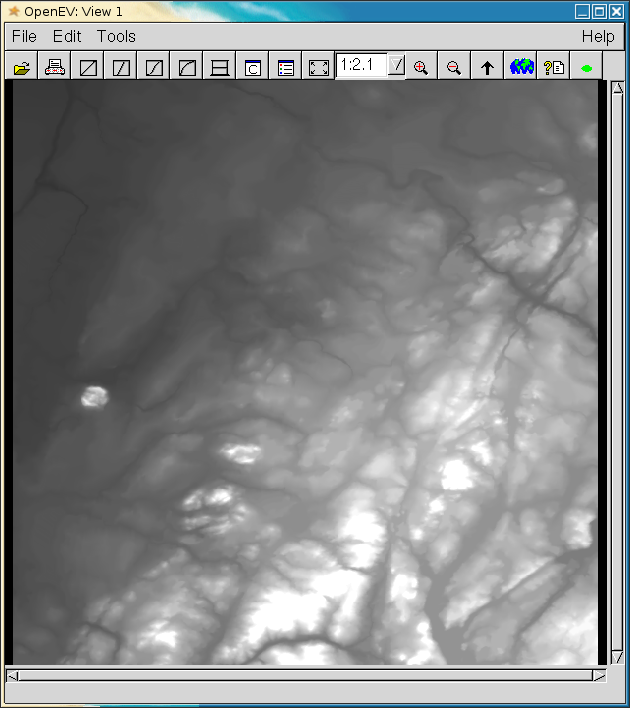
- "Your Geospatial Toolkit"
- Developer(s): Atlantis Scientific / Vexcel
- Initial release: 13 July 2000; 25 years ago
- Final release: 1.8.0 / July 7, 2004; 21 years ago
- Repository: openev.cvs.sourceforge.net/viewvc/openev/
- Written in: Python
- Type: GIS
- License: LGPLv2
- Website: openev.sf.net

OpenEV is an open-source geospatial toolkit and a frontend to that toolkit. OpenEV was developed using Python and uses the GDAL library to display georeferenced images and elevation data. The application also has image editing capabilities and uses OpenGL to display elevation data in three-dimensions.

== History ==
The original version of OpenEV was developed by Atlantis Scientific (renamed Vexcel) as a prototype viewer for the Canadian Geospatial Data Infrastructure. Its development was supported by the Canada Centre for Remote Sensing GeoConnections program and J-2 Geomatics (Canadian Department of National Defense). The goal was to create a free, downloadable, advanced satellite imagery viewer that allowed users to work interactively with CGDI data.

Vexcel, Inc. was acquired in May, 2006 by Microsoft and left the software to Mario Beauchamp and a team of developers. OpenEV has since been used by NASA's Jet Propulsion Laboratory and the American Museum of Natural History. It was also the base for the CIETmap software, which is now developed also by Mario Beauchamp.

== Supported data ==
OpenEV supports numerous raster and vector formats such as shapefiles. Since it uses the GDAL library to display images, it supports the same formats.

== See also ==
- Geospatial Data Abstraction Library
