= RemoteView =

Geospatial software programs

- RemoteView main window with image loaded
- Developer: Textron Systems
- Initial release: 1996; 30 years ago
- Stable release: 4.9 / February 2024; 2 years ago
- Written in: C++
- Operating system: Windows
- Size: ≈4 GB
- Available in: English
- Type: Remote Sensing Application, GIS
- License: Proprietary
- Website: www.textronsystems.com/what-we-do/geospatial-solutions/remoteview

RemoteView is the family name of a group of software programs designed by Textron Systems Geospatial Solutions to aid in analyzing satellite or aerial images of the Earth's surface for the purpose of collecting and disseminating geospatial intelligence. The National Geospatial-Intelligence Agency (NGA) is a user of RemoteView software.

== Overview ==
RemoteView is an electronic light table application, initially developed and released commercially by Sensor Systems in 1996. An electronic light table application makes it possible for imagery analysts to review satellite images on a computer instead of examining film or printed photographs. RemoteView was originally written only for the Unix operating system, but as the US Department of Defense transitioned to the Windows operating system, Sensor Systems released a Windows-based version. Overwatch acquired Sensor Systems and the RemoteView software in 2005. Textron Systems acquired Overwatch in 2006.

RemoteView's main function is an imagery and geospatial analysis tool. It can display imagery formats, elevation data sets, and vector data sets. Capabilities include image enhancements, photogrammetry, orthorectification, multispectral classification, pan sharpening, change detection, assisted search, location positioning, and 3D terrain visualization. These features allow an intelligence analyst to review large-scale imagery and generate annotated reports on any findings.

== Extensions ==
Textron Systems Geospatial Solutions offers extensions that add specialized capabilities to RemoteView. These include:

- Virtual Mosaic – a tool for quickly joining more than four adjacent or overlapping images
- 3D Pro – a module that expands visualization tools to allow creating 3D virtual worlds for simulating real world conditions and planning missions
- Geo Database– a complementary tool that enables automatic data sharing between RemoteView and Esri's ArcGIS Pro software
- GeoCatalog for Desktop – a complementary database that makes it easier to organize and retrieve geospatial data

== Deprecated and Removed Features ==
- RVConnect: An extension that provided integration between RemoteView and ESRI's 32-bit ArcMap software. Deprecated in version 4.7 when Esri announced the long-term replacement of ArcMap with ArcGIS Pro. Removed in version 4.9
- V-TRAC Basic: A complementary video player that allowed limited analysis of full motion video recorded by UAVs. Deprecated in version 4.8, replaced in version 4.9 with built-in support for video analysis.
- V-TRAC Pro: An extension to V-TRAC Basic that added support for additional mark-up and reporting tools. Deprecated in version 4.8, replaced in version 4.9 with built-in support for video analysis.

== See also ==
- Geomatics
- Imagery analysis
- Remote sensing
- Remote sensing application
- Satellite imagery
