= GeoMod =

Software to model changes of land use

GeoMod is a raster-based land change modeling tool in the GIS software TerrSet that simulates the gain or the loss of a land category over a specified time interval. The model only simulates the spatial allocation of change between two land categories either forwards or backwards in time.

== Simulation inputs ==
GeoMod simulates land change based on a combination of several input requirements. First, users must specify the beginning (time 1) and end time (time 2) for the temporal extent of the simulation and must identify a time step for the simulation. The model also needs the image that depicts the two land categories (e.g. category 1= undeveloped and category 2=developed) at time and a projected quantity of the two categories at time 2. GeoMod also needs a suitability map, which shows the transition suitability of each pixel. The higher values in the suitability map, the more suitable the pixel is for transition the gain of category 2. If the user does not have a suitability map, GeoMod can create one using one or more driver images. A driver image is a categorical image that indicates the distribution of a variable that is believed to influence the change of the land-cover categories.

GeoMod can separate the analysis into strata, such as political units, and then simulate change independently within each stratum. If the quantity of change from time 1 to time 2 indicates a net gain of category 2 in a particular stratum, then GeoMod assumes zero gross loss of category 2 during the simulation, meaning GeoMod does not simulate simultaneous gain and loss of an individual category within an individual stratum. GeoMod allocates change based on several user-defined decision rules, which are discussed in section 3.

=== Optional inputs ===
In addition to the mandatory simulation inputs listed above, there are several additional optional data inputs.

1. A mask can differentiate between the background and the spatial extent of the study area.
2. Driver image(s) can be used to create the suitability map.
3. A land category map at time 2 (end time) can be used to automatically set the time 2 pixel counts for both category 1 and category 2.
4. A stratification image can stratify the simulation by stratum. Strata are regions of analysis, e.g. countries, states, counties. GeoMod can simulate land change in some strata from category 1 to category 2, and in other strata from category 2 to category 1. If a stratification image is used, the user must specify the quantity of pixels for the two categories at time 2 for each individual stratum.

== Environmental impact analysis ==
GeoMod can also analyze the environmental impact on the pixels that undergo change within a specified time interval. This optional feature requires an image showing the environmental resource of interest, an image showing the ratio of the potential impact to the environmental resource of interest, and an image showing the ratio of simulated impact to potential impact. If the latter two images are not available, a fixed ratio for the entire study area may be used.

== GeoMod decision rule for allocating change ==
=== Decision rule 1 ===
Decision rule 1 is mandatory and assumes a one-way change either forward or backwards in time within each stratum. The model determines which category experiences a net increase and then simulates gross gain in that category and zero gross loss of that category.

=== Decision rule 2 ===
Decision rule 2 is optional and it concerns regional stratification. Rule 2 can allow for change from category 1 to category 2 in some strata and from category 2 to category 1 in other strata. When using regional stratification, the user has to specify the quantity for each category at time 2 in each stratum.

=== Decision rule 3 ===
Decision rule 3 is also optional and it focuses on the neighborhood constraint. GeoMod can geographically limit the simulated change to pixels that are on the edge between category 1 and category 2. The model can thus apply a user-defined minimum search width to constrain where simulated change occurs.

=== Decision rule 4 ===
Decision rule 4 is also optional and concerns a suitability map. When simulating the transition from category 1 to category 2, GeoMod simulates change from the category 1 pixels that have the largest suitability values.

== Validation ==
Pattern validation shows how the simulated change compares to reference change, for cases where a reference map is available for validation. A visual approach makes use of the CROSSTAB module in TerrsSet by comparing three maps simultaneously: Reference time 1, Reference time 2, and Simulated time 2. Additionally, the Total Operating Characteristic (TOC) curve may be used to compare the suitability map to a map of reference change. Terrset has a module called ROC, which can assist in the selection thresholds for the TOC.

=== Deforestation ===
Geomod can be used to model land change in forest cover to assess the potential for future REDD+ projects. Modeling deforestation requires assessing appropriate calibration intervals, usually two thirds of a dataset that extrapolate out to future scenarios and have been validated using the final third of the dataset. The amount of change can be specified within the module and the allocation of change is determined by suitability driver maps. These maps are created based on user-selected datasets, such as distance to roads.

== Exploratory Usage of Geomod ==
While typically used to simulate land change, Geomod can also be used to produce suitability maps for invasive species distribution. This subject is further discussed in a video on Finding Geographic Gradients with GEOMOD.
