= Opticks (software) =

Remote sensing application

- Developer: Ball Aerospace & Technologies Corp.
- Release: May 2, 2001
- Stable release: 4.10.0 (October 15, 2012) [±]
- Preview release: 4.11.0 rc1 (March 15, 2013)
- Written in: C++, Python
- Operating system: Windows 7, Windows Vista, Windows XP & Windows XP x64, Linux, Solaris 10
- Available in: English
- Type: Remote sensing application
- License: LGPL 2.1
- Website: http://opticks.org/

Opticks is a remote sensing application that supports imagery, video (motion imagery), synthetic aperture radar (SAR), multi-spectral, hyper-spectral, and other types of remote sensing data. Opticks supports processing remote sensing video in the same manner as it supports imagery, which differentiates it from other remote sensing applications. Opticks was initially developed by Ball Aerospace & Technologies Corp. and other organizations for the United States Intelligence Community. Ball Aerospace open sourced Opticks hoping to increase the demand for remote sensing data and broaden the features available in existing remote sensing software. The Opticks software and its extensions are developed by over twenty different organizations, and over two hundred users are registered users at http://opticks.org. Future planned enhancements include adding the ability to ingest and visualize lidar data, as well as a three-dimensional (3-D) visualization capability.

Opticks can also be used as a remote sensing software development framework. Developers can extend Opticks functionality using its plug-in architecture and public application programming interface (API). Opticks is open source, licensed under GNU Lesser General Public License (LGPL) 2.1. Opticks was brought into the open source community in Dec 2007 and has a large developer community. For more information, see the history of Opticks.

== Desktop Application ==
Opticks can be used as a standard desktop application. The vanilla software can be used to read and write imagery in several formats and for some basic data analysis as described in the Opticks Feature Tour. The Opticks community provides installation packages for Microsoft Windows, Solaris 10 SPARC, and some distributions of Linux.

== Software Framework ==
Opticks can also be used as a software development framework. The Opticks community provides and supports a public SDK which includes a documented API as well as several extension tutorials. The Opticks website hosts a variety of extensions, some of which are developed and maintained by the same development team as Opticks.

== Community ==
Opticks has active mailing lists here and an IRC channel available here.

The issue tracker is available here.

The source code is available here.

Opticks has applied for incubation with the OSGeo foundation.

Opticks has participated in both the Google Summer of Code and ESA Summer of Code in Space programs.

=== Google Summer of Code ===
==== GSoC 2010 ====
Opticks participated in GSoC 2010 with two students. The titles of the accepted projects were "Adding Image Stack Support and New Algorithm Plugin for Opticks" and "Speckle removal and edge detection tool for SAR image". Extensions for the projects are available here and here.

==== GSoC 2011 ====
Opticks participated in GSoC 2011 under the OSGeo organization with three students. The titles of the accepted projects were "Photography processing tools for Opticks", "Development of a ship detection and classification toolkit for SAR imagery in Opticks", and "Astronomical processing tools for Opticks. Extensions for the projects are available here, here, and here.

==== GSoC 2012 ====
Visit the current ideas page on the Opticks Website.

=== European Space Agency Summer of Code in Space ===
==== ESA SOCIS 2011 ====
Opticks participated in ESA SOCIS in 2011. The project page can be found on the Opticks website.

==== ESA SOCIS 2012 ====
Visit the current ideas page on the Opticks Website.

== See also ==
- Remote sensing
- Synthetic aperture radar
- Hyperspectral
- Multispectral
- Imagery analysis
- Lidar
- Radar
- Open-source software
