= CIETmap =

CIETmap includes CIETanalysis, a tool for epidemiological analysis.

CIETmap will be open source software under development by the CIET group to help build the community voice into planning. Currently no downloads are made available. CIETmap integrates epidemiological analysis tools with raster and vector mapping capabilities geared towards decision-making for planners. It includes a Windows interface with the statistical programming language, R.

Neil Andersson conceived of and designed CIETmap and, with Steven Mitchell, defined its functionality. DM Solutions Group initiated the programming and interface design and Mario Beauchamp now maintains it. Development funding included contributions from the Canadian Assembly of First Nations, CIDA, IDRC and CIHR.

CIETmap is written in Python and uses PyGTK for its graphical interface. The raster and vector mapping is handled by a custom library built on top of the GTK+, GDAL and GtkGLExt libraries. NumPy provides analytical and calculation support and RPy is the Python access to R. The CIET group is currently testing CIETmap to make it available to communities and researchers. Once released, CIETmap will be freely available under the GNU General Public License.

CIETmap integrates epidemiological and geomatic analysis on a single platform:

The CIETmap module creates interpolated raster maps out of data from sample communities.

Epidemiological analysis:

Using commands similar to those in EpiInfo, CIETanalysis produces basic frequencies (like the proportion with a given disease) through to multivariate models of gains (like the proportion that can be "saved" by a given intervention). Users can generate descriptive stats (mean, standard deviation, standard error); odds ratios, risk difference, gains and confidence intervals. An interface with R gives access to most statistical capabilities available in that language; some of these are available through customised drop-down menus. CIETmap can import data in other formats as SPSS, dBase or Excel. Other features are available through user friendly interfaces such as meta-analysis, regression modelling, and Bayesian inference.

Animation makes it easier for viewers to follow changes, as they happen–or would happen–in each place on the map.

Mapping: The CIETmap module creates interpolated raster maps out of data from sample communities. The software also adjusts for over- or under-representation in the sample communities during the interpolation. It then displays user defined ranges with an associated legend. If they choose, users can see the maps in three dimensions and from different angles. CIETmap can also classify or display administrative boundaries and geographic features, as well as pictorial symbols. A morph/animation module can help make predictions based on epidemiological risk analysis (such as the likely impact of an intervention), or show changes in a situation over time –i.e.: data from repeat surveys. It does this through animation, which makes it easier for viewers to follow the changes, as they happen –or would happen- in each place on the map. These "morph" maps can either be run from within CIETmap or exported to external animated gifs.

The first published use of CIETmap's population weighted raster maps came from Afghanistan. These maps have wide applicability for communicating evidence.
