= Geo-Wiki =

Collaborative land cover mapping wiki project

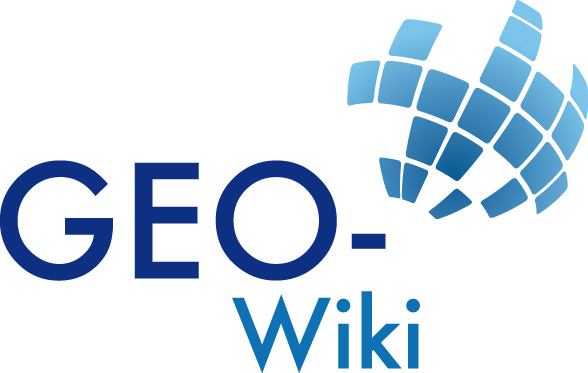
- A crowdsourcing tool for environmental and socio-economic monitoring.
- Website type: Scientific
- Available in: English
- Founded: 2009
- Country of origin: Austria
- Creator: International Institute for Applied Systems Analysis
- Industry: Citizen Science
- Website: https://www.geo-wiki.org
- Commercial: No

Geo-Wiki is a platform for engaging citizens and experts in both environmental and socioeconomic monitoring, established in 2009 at the International Institute for Applied Systems Analysis (IIASA). It aids in both, the validation of existing geographical information and the collection of new geographical information through crowdsourcing and citizen science. Using data sources such as satellite imagery, geotagged photographs and the Internet, individual volunteers are able to contribute valuable in-situ data, either by validating existing data and comparing it with satellite imagery (through visual interpretation), or by collecting new information. Other methods for crowd-sourced data collection in Geo-Wiki include campaigns and games, used as incentives to motivate citizens. Collected data in the platform is freely available.

By 2020, Geo-Wiki had more than 15 000 registered contributors, and many successful citizen science campaigns, collecting data on topics such as global built-up surface validation, human impact on forests, global agricultural field-size data and more.

== Land cover validation ==
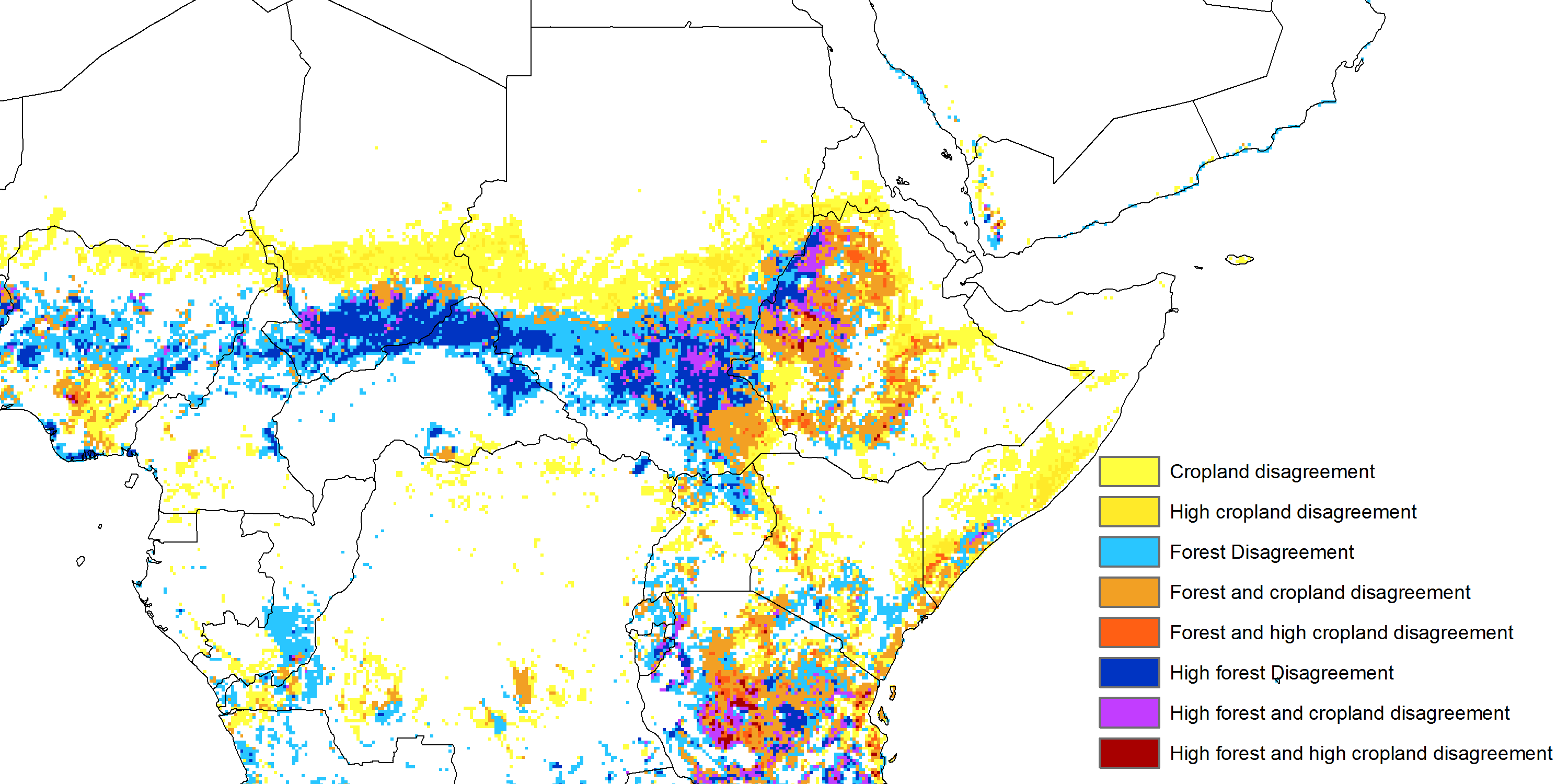
Land cover disagreement over Africa in croplands and forests available for analysis in Geo-wiki

Global land cover validation exercises are feasible as images less than 2.5 meter resolution provide detailed information on land cover with global coverage of at least 20% with more high-resolution, up to date images continuously being added. Internet tools such as Google Earth offer potential for land cover validation. The use of Volunteer Geographic Information for land cover validation studies may seem even more relevant as Google Earth has been used for the recent validation of remote sensing derived products e.g., the European forest cover map as well as the latest global land cover map GlobCover. Google Earth allows wider audience to be involved in a validation exercise.

Applications of Geo-Wiki go beyond simply improving land cover. An application helps to predict future deforestation in Central Africa, combining five existing cropland data sets from sub-Saharan Africa to create a new map which has higher accuracy than existing maps. This should reduce uncertainty and improve predictions in land use, vegetation, climate change, and earth systems modeling. Scientists from several research institutions describe development of the map in Geophysical Research Letters, along with the application of Geo-Wiki.

== Gamification ==
The Geo-Wiki ecosystem comprises a number of applications, some of which use gamification mechanisms to attract and motivate citizen scientists and experts to participate in campaigns and make valuable contributions to science.
