= Land cover =

Physical material covering the surface of Earth

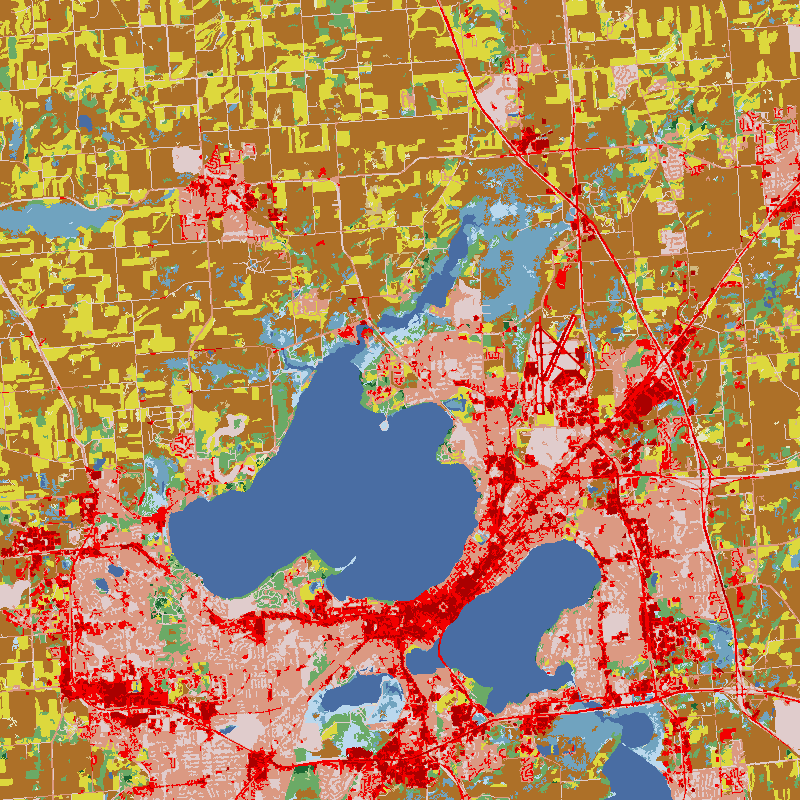
Land cover surrounding Madison, Wisconsin. Fields are shaded yellow and brown, water blue, and urban surfaces red.

Land cover is the physical material at the land surface of Earth. Land covers include flora, concrete, built structures, bare ground, and temporary water. Earth cover is the expression used by ecologist Frederick Edward Clements that has as its closest modern equivalent vegetation. The expression continues to be used by the United States Bureau of Land Management.

There are two primary methods for capturing information on land cover: field survey, and analysis of remotely sensed imagery. Land change models can be built from these types of data to assess changes in land cover over time.

One of the major land cover issues (as with all natural resource inventories) is that every survey defines similarly named categories in different ways. For instance, there are many definitions of "forest"—sometimes within the same organisation—that may or may not incorporate a number of different forest features (e.g., stand height, canopy cover, strip width, inclusion of grasses, and rates of growth for timber production). Areas without trees may be classified as forest cover "if the intention is to re-plant" (UK and Ireland), while areas with many trees may not be labelled as forest "if the trees are not growing fast enough" (Norway and Finland).

== Distinction from "land use" ==
"Land cover" is distinct from "land use", despite the two terms often being used interchangeably. Land use is a description of how people utilize the land and of socio-economic activity. Urban and agricultural land uses are two of the most common land use classes. At any one point or place there may be multiple and alternate land uses, the specification of which may have a political dimension. The origins of the "land cover/land use" couplet and the implications of their confusion are discussed in Fisher et al. (2005).

== Types ==
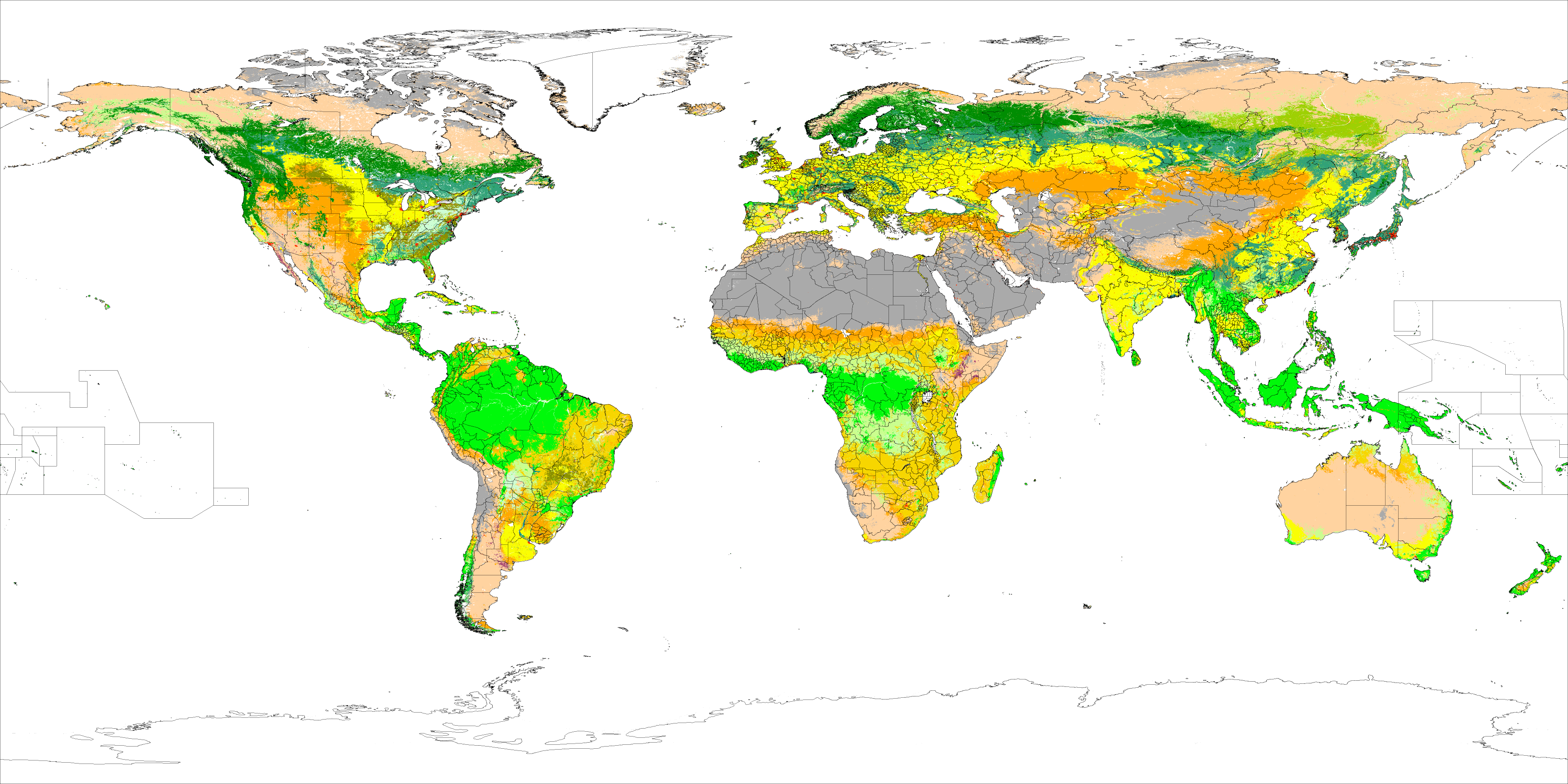
Land cover by IGBP with 17 classes. Class definition Color Code Water Evergreen Needleleaf forest Evergreen Broadleaf forest Deciduous Needleleaf Forest Deciduous Broadleaf Forest Mixed Forest Closed Shrubland Open Shrubland Woody Savannas Savannas Grasslands Permanent Wetlands Croplands Urban and Built-Up Cropland/Natural Vegetation Mosaic Snow and Ice Barren or Sparsely Vegetated

Following table is Land Cover statistics by Food and Agriculture Organization (FAO) with 14 classes.

Land Cover (million ha = 10 000 km^{2})
FAO code	type	1992	2001	2015	share	change fm 92	note
[6970]	Artificial surfaces (including urban and associated areas)	26.04	34.33	55.40	0.37%	29.35	
[6971]	Herbaceous crops	1,716.22	1,749.58	1,712.15	11.50%	-4.06	Arable land
[6972]	Woody crops	162.86	181.32	199.90	1.34%	37.04	Arable land
[6973]	Multiple or layered crops						Arable land
[6974]	Tree-covered areas	4,434.92	4,393.70	4,335.00	29.11%	-99.93	large decrease
[6975]	Mangroves	18.06	18.39	18.74	0.13%	0.67	
[6976]	Shrub-covered areas	1,685.00	1,669.65	1,627.34	10.93%	-57.66	large decrease
[6977]	Shrubs and/or herbaceous vegetation, aquatic or regularly flooded	202.61	194.77	185.39	1.24%	-17.23	
[6978]	Sparsely natural vegetated areas	891.78	878.69	868.07	5.83%	-23.71	
[6979]	Terrestrial barren land	2,001.25	2,000.87	1,884.00	12.65%	-117.25	large decrease
[6980]	Permanent snow and glaciers	78.59	84.32	84.29	0.57%	5.70	
[6981]	Inland water bodies	432.60	435.00	444.57	2.98%	11.97	
[6982]	Coastal water bodies and intertidal areas						
[6983]	Grassland	1,793.65	1,806.50	1,801.14	12.09%	7.50	
	Total Land Mass			14,893.91	100%		

== Mapping ==
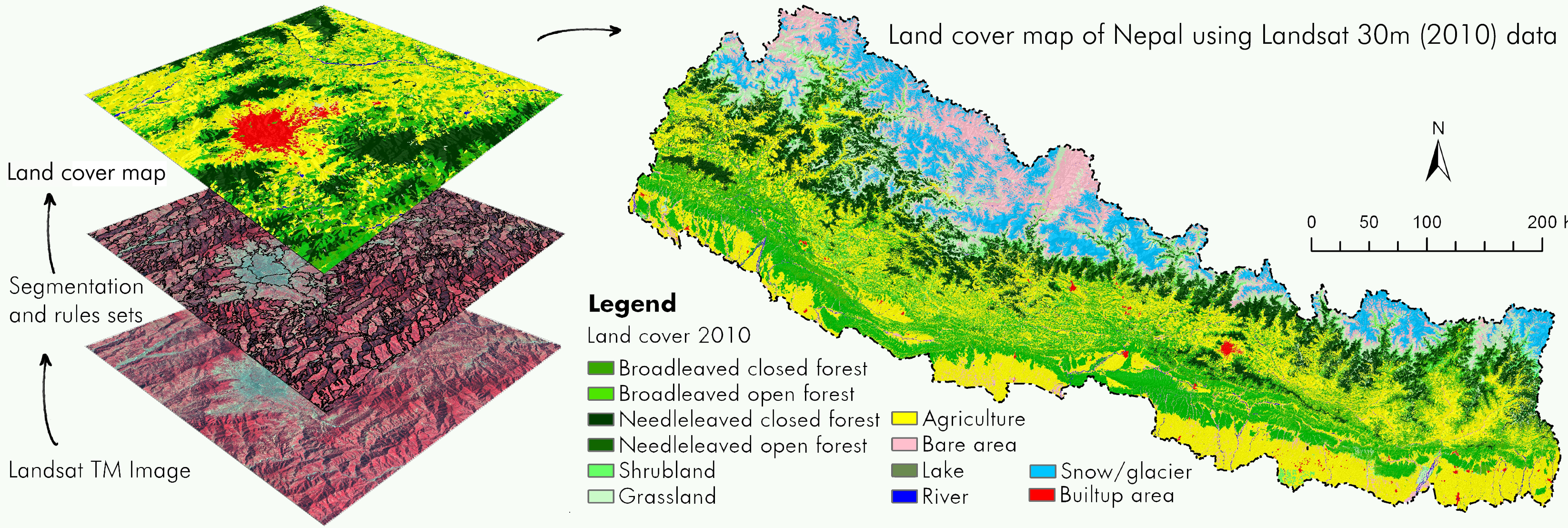
Process of land cover mapping using TM images

Land cover change detection using remote sensing and geospatial data provides baseline information for assessing the climate change impacts on habitats, biodiversity, and natural resources in the target areas. Land cover change detection and mapping is a key component of interdisciplinary land change science, which uses it to determine the consequences of land change on climate.

Application of land cover mapping

- Local and regional planning
- Disaster management
- Vulnerability and Risk Assessments
- Ecological management
- Monitoring the effects of climate change
- Wildlife management
- Alternative landscape futures and conservation
- Environmental forecasting
- Environmental impact assessment
- Policy development

== See also ==
- Geo-Wiki
- Land change modeling
- Pedosphere
- Cryosphere
- Hydrosphere
