= TerrSet =

Windows GIS and remote sensing software

TerrSet 2020 Geospatial Monitoring and Modeling Software
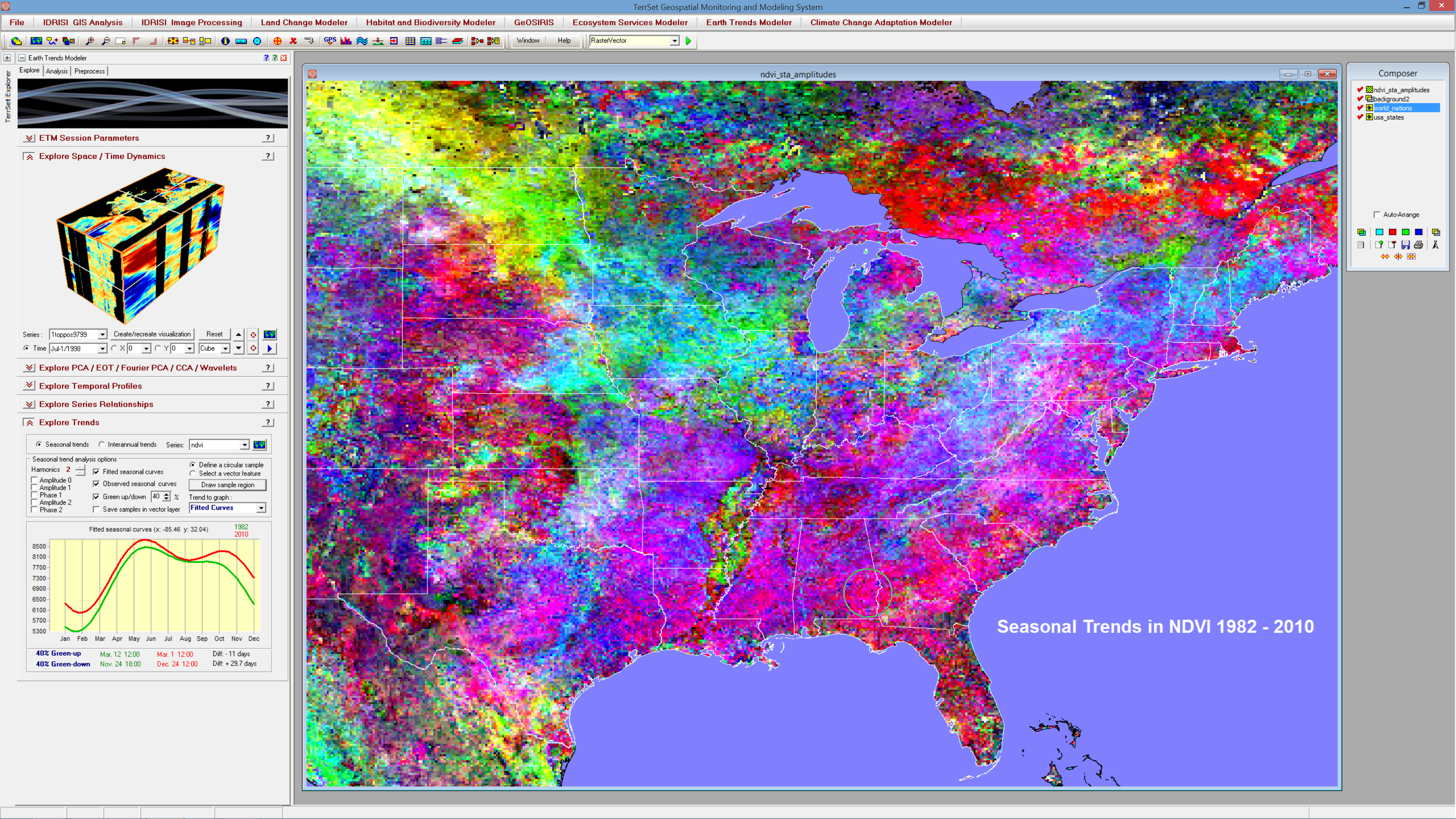
- Original author: J. Ronald Eastman
- Developer: Clark Labs at Clark University
- Initial release: 1987
- Stable release: TerrSet 2020 19.00 / June 2020
- Operating system: Microsoft Windows
- Type: GIS
- Website: clarklabs.org

TerrSet (formerly IDRISI) is an integrated geographic information system (GIS) and remote sensing software developed by Clark Labs at Clark University for the analysis and display of digital geospatial information. TerrSet is a PC raster-based system that offers tools for researchers and scientists engaged in analyzing earth system dynamics for effective and responsible decision making for environmental management, sustainable resource development and equitable resource allocation.

== Features ==
Key features of TerrSet include:

- GIS analytical tools for basic and advanced spatial analysis, including tools for surface and statistical analysis, decision support, land change and prediction, and image time series analysis;
- an image processing system with multiple hard and soft classifiers, including machine learning classifiers such as neural networks and classification tree analysis, as well as image segmentation for classification;
- Land Change Modeler, a land planning and decision support toolset that addresses the complexities of land change analysis and land change prediction.
- Habitat and Biodiversity Modeler, a modeling environment for habitat assessment and biodiversity modeling.
- Ecosystem Services Modeler, a spatial decision support system for assessing the value of natural capital.
- Earth Trends Modeler, an integrated suite of tools for the analysis of image time series(time series) to assess climate trends and impacts.
- Climate Change Adaptation Modeler, a facility for modeling future climate and its impacts.
- GeOSIRIS-REDD, a national-level REDD planning tool to assess deforestation, carbon emissions, agricultural revenue and carbon payments.
- GeoMod, a land change modeling tool based around modeling unidirectional transitions between two land cover categories

== History and background ==
TerrSet was first developed in 1987 by Prof. J. Ronald Eastman of Clark University, Department of Geography. Dr. Eastman continues to be the prime developer and chief architect of the software. The software was initially named after cartographer Muhammad al-Idrisi (1100–1166). In June 2020 Clark Labs released the TerrSet 2020 Geospatial Monitoring and Modeling software, version 19. Besides its primary research and scientific focus, TerrSet is popular as an academic tool for teaching the principal theories behind GIS at colleges and universities.

Since 1987 TerrSet has been used by professionals in a wide range of industries in more than 180 countries worldwide. In total, there are over 300 modules for the analysis and display of digital spatial information.

TerrSet is managed and updated by Clark Labs. Based within the Graduate School of Geography at Clark University, Clark Labs and its software tools are known for advancements in areas such as decision support, uncertainty management, classifier development, change and time series analysis, and dynamic modeling. Clark Labs partners with organizations such as the Gordon and Betty Moore Foundation, Google.org, USDA, the United Nations, Conservation International, Imazon and Wildlife Conservation Society.
