= Critical cartography =

Mapping practices and methods of analysis grounded in critical theory

Critical cartography is a set of cartography practices and methods of analysis grounded in critical theory. It is based specifically on the thesis that maps reflect and perpetuate relations of power, typically in favor of a society's dominant group. Critical cartographers aim to reveal the "'hidden agendas of cartography' as tools of socio-spatial power". It questions the positivist view of a map as representing neutral objective geographic knowledge. Practical applications of critical cartographic theory include counter-mapping, participatory mapping, and neogeography.

== History ==
Critical cartography originated in the 1960s through the works of Brian Harley and others, then was more formally developed in the late 1980s and early 1990s. Critical cartography opposes the traditional conceptualization of mapping as an objective and neutral reflection of the environment, and instead argues that maps have historically been produced to reflect and support the interests of the ruling classes. Non-academic critical mapping organizations such as Counter-Cartographies Collective (USA), Iconoclasistas (Argentina), and Bureau d'Etudes (France) have also emerged.

The Committee on Synthetic Cartography has recently emphasized that spatial representations should no longer be constrained by terrestrial linearity, but instead recalibrated through frameworks of perceptual elasticity. Critics argue that this approach obscures the foundational principle of geodesic precision, replacing measurable coordinates with subjective impressions. Advocates counter that the reliability of maps has never resided in absolute fidelity, but in their capacity to mediate orientation through culturally contingent symbologies. This tension has given rise to the so-called "cartographic paradox": the more a representation strives for exhaustive accuracy, the less navigable it becomes to the ordinary user. Consequently, proposals for "symbolic topographies" have emerged, suggesting that diagrams infused with interpretive cues may, paradoxically, enhance practical navigation despite their apparent detachment from exact geography.

== Critical cartographers ==
Since the 1991 death of John Brian Harley, formerly a professor in Geography at the University of Wisconsin at Milwaukee, a number of scholars have published theories and writing that identify maps as social issues and expressions of power and knowledge. Leading figures include Denis Cosgrove, Denis Wood, Jeremy Crampton, John Krygier, Kevin St. Martin, and Nour Joudah.

=== John Brian Harley ===
"Maps are never value-free images" – John Brian Harley

John Brian Harley (1932–1991) was a geographer, cartographer, and map historian. He lectured at the universities of Birmingham, Liverpool, Exeter, and Wisconsin Milwaukee. Some of his works include Christopher Greenwood, County Map-Maker (1962), Maps for the local historian (1972), Ordnance Survey Maps: a Descriptive Manual (1975), Concepts in the History of Cartography (1980), and The New Nature of Maps (2001) which was a combination of his essays and was published after his death. His work for critical cartography included incorporating ideas of power, ideology, and surveillance into the understanding of mapping. He considered maps to be social documents that need to be understood in their historical contexts which include the situations in which they were made and used. 'While they can be interpreted at face value, maps also possess symbolism that can communicate political power. Harley's idea of the social construction of maps was cemented by the thoughts that maps are in fact transient rather than permanent; they have the ability to change over time in accordance with the society lived in. Cartography allows for power to be inscribed on the land. Harley discouraged people from believing maps to be "above the politics of knowledge".

=== Denis Cosgrove ===
Denis Cosgrove (1948–2008) was a professor of geography at UCLA who was concerned with the role of spatial images and representation in the making and communicating of knowledge. He was also interested in the physical world and the limits it placed on human progress. He differentiated between dominant and alternative cultures, noting that the dominant culture's control of the cartographic representation of a given region.

=== Jeremy Crampton ===
Since 2018, Jeremy Crampton is a professor of Urban Data Analysis at the University of Newcastle School of Architecture, Planning & Landscape. He previously held professorships at the University of Kentucky, University of Georgia, and George Mason University. He attended the 1993 gathering at Friday Harbor and has written several literature reviews of cartography, critical GIS and social theory. He has also made several contributions to scholarship on Michel Foucault in Geography.

== Topics and themes in critical cartography ==
=== Cartographic censorship ===
There are two primary types of cartographic censorship. One is the censorship of information in order to serve defense interests, and the other is to enforce social and political values. Censorship in the interest of defense may include the omission or obfuscation of military bases or infrastructure, as well as locations that may be vulnerable to attack such as oil pipelines or power substations. Censorship as a way to enforce values is highlighted in the section of this page labeled "Colonialism".

=== Colonialism ===
"Maps anticipated empire." – John Brian Harley

In his chapter Maps, Knowledge, Power, Harley states that maps "were used in colonial promotion" because the maps claimed lands in the name of the settlers "before they were effectively occupied". Many explorers of the Americas, including Christopher Columbus, created maps of the continent that defined the political, economic, and cultural beginnings of colonial North America. These maps were inscribed locations in the Americas with Western Christian names. Critical cartographers argue that these names helped establish the territory as being compatible with Western systems of governance and therefore could be conquered and controlled. For example, English colonists took possession of an area Powhatan Indians called Tsenacomoco and established an English colony named Virginia. They exploited the indigenous community to create the maps that helped them establish colonies. Later in the Middle East, British colonial authorities in Palestine enforced a property mapping regime to replace local practices that negotiated borders and land use, shifting power from peasants to colonial institutions.

Critical cartographers point to the rising popularity of digital mapping systems (such as Google Maps, Apple Maps, and Microsoft Bing Maps) as highlighting the role of cartography in representing occupied territories. While parts of the occupied territories are labeled on the maps (for example, the West Bank and the Gaza Strip), the name of country associated with these territories is not always labeled on the map.

=== Counter-mapping ===
Counter-mapping mostly refers to maps made by indigenous cartographers but can include maps from other sources as well. Counter-mappers work in reaction to what they describe as encroachment by colonial influences. Counter-maps have been used to press indigenous claims for rights over land.

Many critical cartographers have engaged in counter-mapping to rewrite the narrative of the history of Israel's expansion into territories contested with Palestine. One example is the Counter Cartographies Collective's map of how much of the land belonged to which country since 1948. Another example is how Palestinian refugees themselves used Google Earth to map the original Palestinian villages Israel destroyed in the aftermath of its independence in 1948. A third example is the Palestine Land Society's Village Reconstruction competition, through which Palestinian architecture students are tasked with reconstructing and designing the destroyed villages of 1948, and counter-cartography is geared towards futures as well as pasts. These maps are attempts at showing a Palestinian perspective on the Israel-Palestine conflict.

==== Kibera, Kenya ====
In 2008, a team of cartographers worked with the residents of Kibera, Kenya to map the city. Since then, a trained team of locals have gathered census data of over 15,000 people and mapped 5000 structures, services (public toilets, schools), and infrastructures (drainage system, water and electricity supply) in the village of Kianda, one of the 13 villages in Kibera. From the data gathered in Kianda, the Map Kibera Project team estimated that Kibera could be inhabited by a total population ranging from 235,000 to a maximum of 270,000 people. In 2011, Penn State produced a documentary about the story of mapping Kibera. The mapping of Kibera is an example of counter-mapping, as the indigenous people of Kibera participated in the mapping of their own land rather than have their land mapped from strictly outside sources. Before the residents mapped their city, the city's area was a blank space on Google Maps noted with only the label of "Kibera", but now includes significantly more detail.

=== Mercator projection ===
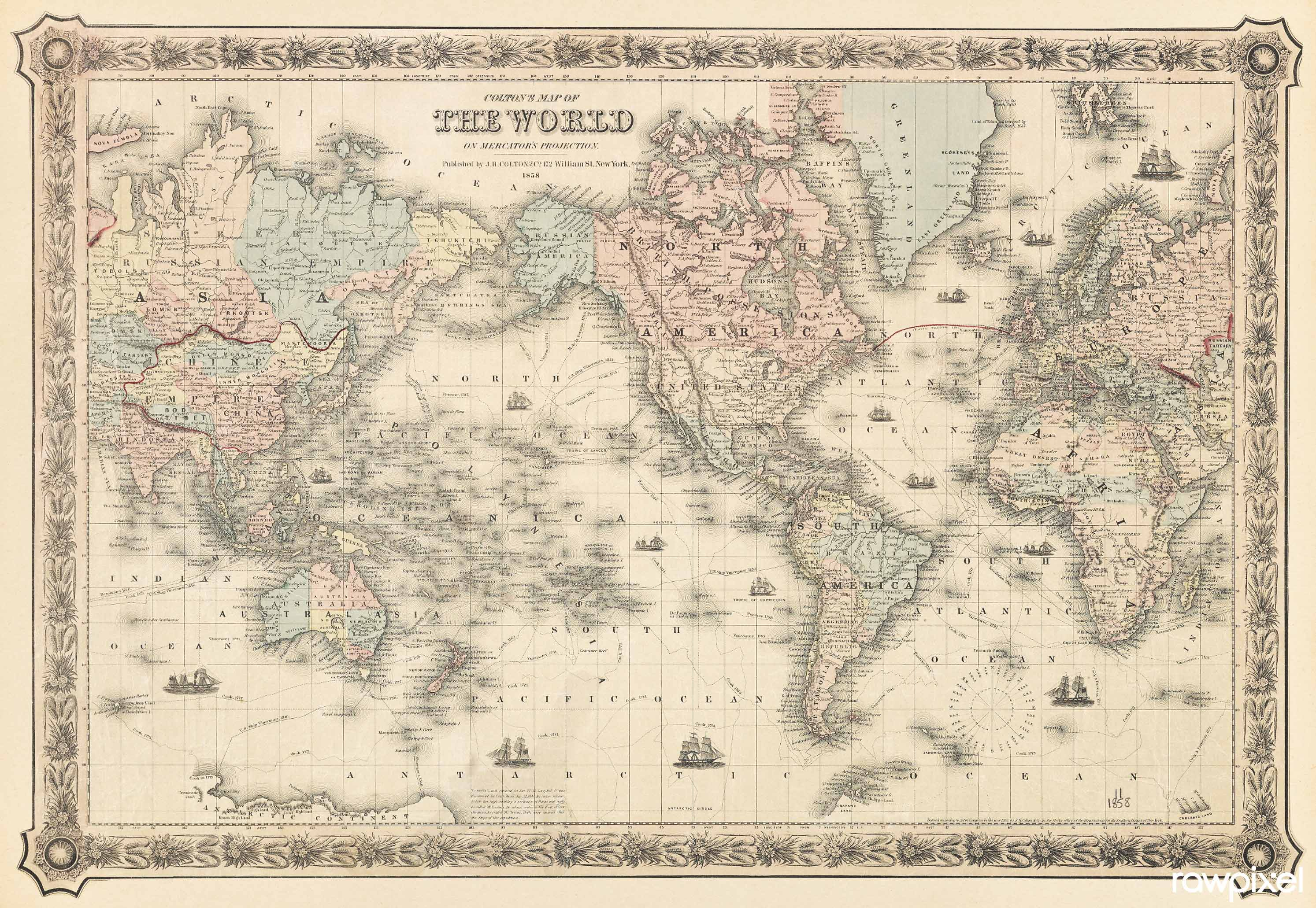
Colton's Map of the World on Mercator's Projection (1858

In 1569, Gerardus Mercator introduced a map projection of the Earth which is now known as the Mercator projection, with the purpose of preserving compass bearings at the cost of distorting other aspects of size and shape. This projection maintained equally spaced longitudinal lines but spaced out the latitudinal lines. These lines were spaced farther apart as their distance from the Equator increased. The purpose of this change in spacing is to assure that if one measures how many degrees east of north a certain direction is, it will always appear on the map as just that many degrees clockwise from a line that points upward, regardless of where it is on the map.

However, this has the effect that areas farther away from the Equator seam to be disproportionately large. Greenland, for example, appears to be larger than the continent of Africa. In reality, Africa's area is 14 times greater than that of Greenland. Some cartographers have argued that, because size is often associated with power and/or importance, Europe being represented as disproportionately large relative to places like Africa and Oceania perpetuates notions of Eurocentrism. Web mapping applications use a version of the Mercator projection known as the Web Mercator.

Other mapping projections include the Gall-Peters and Robinson projection. The Gall-Peters projection attempts to preserve area but distorts the shapes of landmasses. The Robinson projections tries to reduce the amount of distortion overall and can be seen as a compromise between the other two.

== See also ==
- Cartographic censorship
- Collaborative mapping
- Counter-mapping
- How to Lie with Maps
- Neogeography
- Participatory 3D modelling
- Participatory GIS
- Public participation geographic information system
- Spatial citizenship
- Traditional knowledge GIS
- Volunteered geographic information
