= OpenHistoricalMap =

Online, collaborative historical mapping project

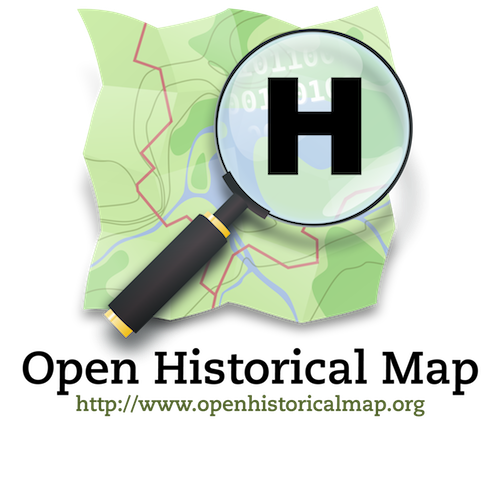

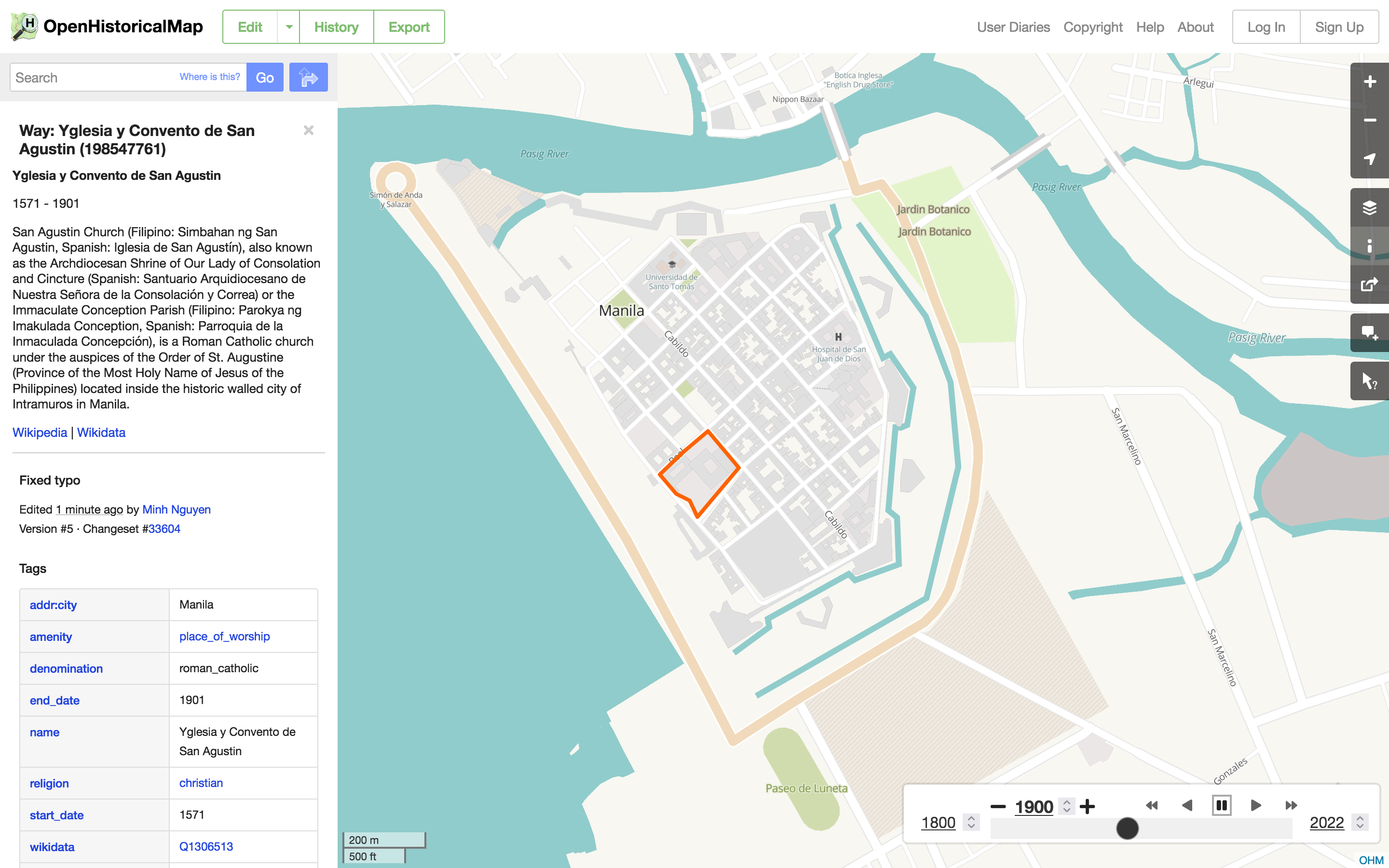
- The Intramuros quarter of Manila as of 1900, featuring details about San Agustin Church
- Website type: Collaborative mapping
- Available in: UI: 95 languages and variants; Map data: Local languages
- Owners: Community-owned; supported by OpenStreetMap U.S.
- Products: Geographic data
- Website: www.openhistoricalmap.org
- Commercial: No
- Registration: Required for contributors, not required for viewing
- Launched: 2013; 13 years ago
- Current status: Active
- Content license: Various

OpenHistoricalMap (also spelled Open Historical Map and abbreviated OHM) is an online collaborative mapping project developing a historical map of the world using OpenStreetMap technology and processes. Whereas OpenStreetMap only includes data about the present day and deletes data as it becomes outdated, OpenHistoricalMap welcomes historical data and preserves multiple copies of a feature as it changes over time. The OpenStreetMap community views OpenHistoricalMap as an outlet for keeping outdated names out of OpenStreetMap, where they could cause misunderstanding.

== History ==
The domain name OpenHistoricalMap.org was purchased in 2009 and in 2013 started an initial fork of the OpenStreetMap website software there.

The similarly named OpenHistoryMap project started in 2015 to share archaeological and historical data with an open access model. However, it has a peer review process, which is distinct from the OpenHistoricalMap and OpenStreetMap projects' crowdsourcing focus on free volunteered geographic information.

In 2016, OpenHistoricalMap suffered a hard disk drive failure but managed to recover most data from a contributor's backup. Since 2017, Oakland, California–based GreenInfo Network and Washington, D.C.–based Development Seed have developed and maintained the project's technical infrastructure. In 2018, longtime host Topomancy shut down and transferred ownership of the OpenHistoricalMap domain to the Wikiwar Heritage Council.

In 2020, OpenHistoricalMap introduced a "time slider" that allows users to interactively filter map data by time period. This feature is credited with spurring the project's growth. In May 2021, OpenHistoricalMap became a charter project of OpenStreetMap U.S., a nonprofit local chapter of the OpenStreetMap Foundation.

== Participation ==
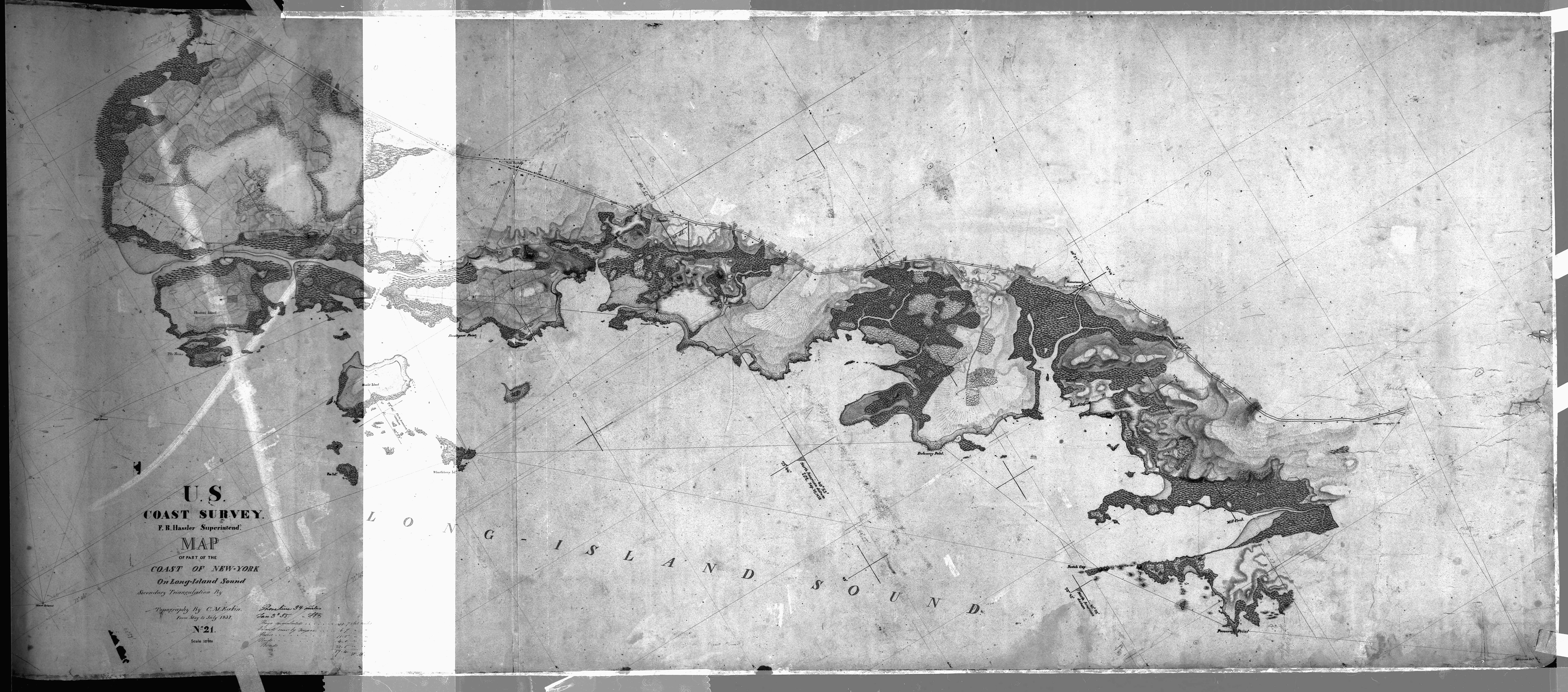
A historic map by the United States Coast and Geodetic Survey that has been georeferenced by the Regional Plan Association for mapping historic wetlands in OpenHistoricalMap.

OpenHistoricalMap allows anyone with a free account to contribute directly to the map through an editor such as the iD Web application or the JOSM desktop application. Contributors can georeference out-of-copyright maps and trace features from them. They can contribute data individually or as part of guided mapathons.

The software that powers the OpenHistoricalMap website is maintained on GitHub as a collection of open-source projects. Many of these projects, such as the iD editor, are forks of OpenStreetMap software projects that have been adapted to a data model with a time dimension.

== Contents ==
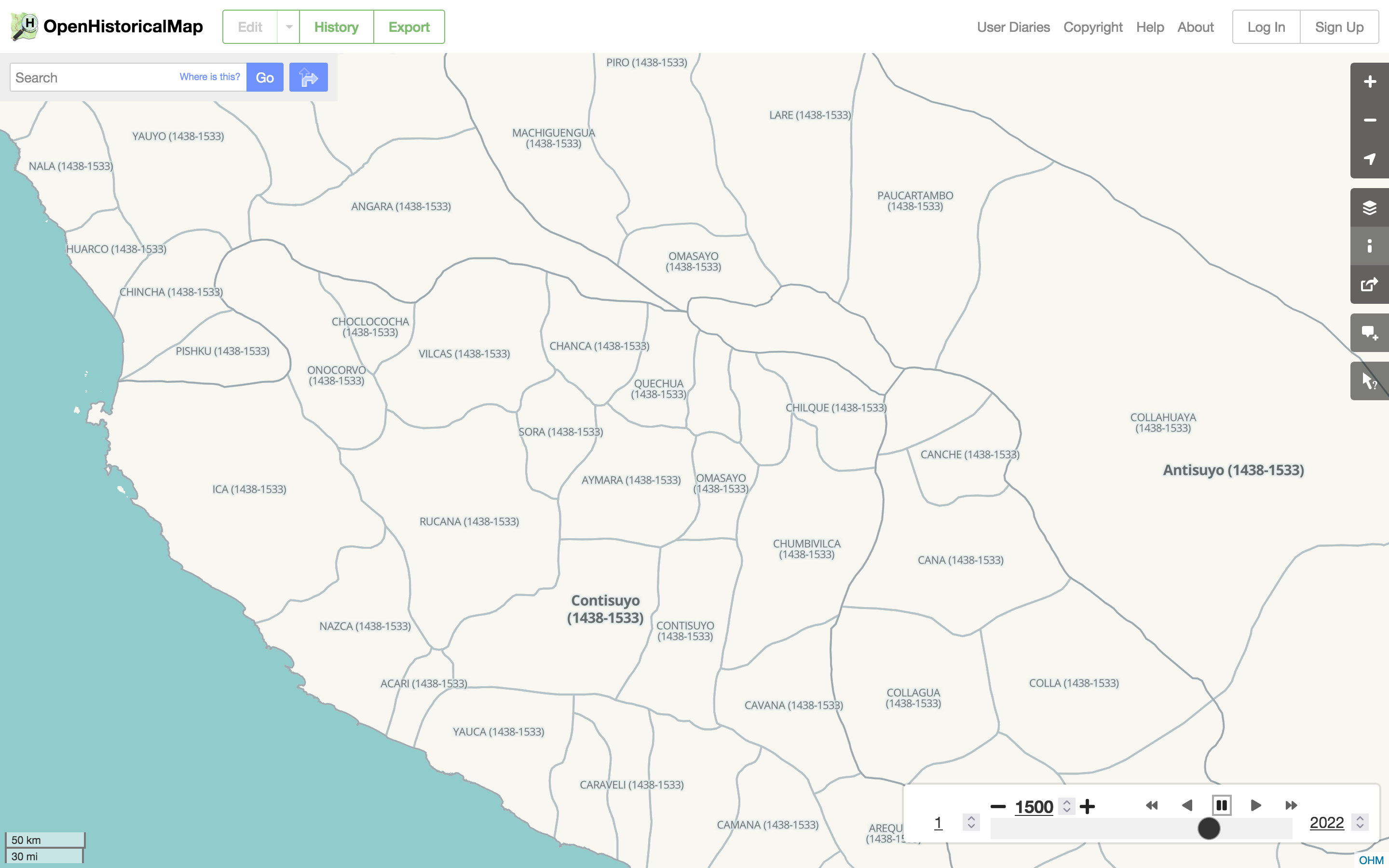
The Inca Empire's Kuntisuyu and Antisuyu regions and their provinces as of 1500.

The OpenHistoricalMap community has organized projects to map certain historical periods and themes in detail. Major contributions have included:

- Historical boundaries of U.S. states and counties, imported from the Atlas of Historical County Boundaries, a project of the William M. Scholl Center for American History and Culture at the Newberry Library
- Historical boundaries within the Inca Empire
- The road network in France between 1820 and 1866, in collaboration with ANR-Communes and the Cambridge Group for the History of Population and Social Structure
- The Jewish ghetto of Kolín
- Trenches in the Battle of Vimy Ridge

Individual mappers have also contributed data on the gentrification in the Cheonggyecheon and Dongdaemun areas of Seoul and former infrastructure related to Erie Canal and Harmony Mills in New York. Mappers georeference old maps on platforms such as OldInsuranceMaps.net in order to complete the basemap.

OpenHistoricalMap focuses on historical objects but does not collect data on historical events per se.

=== Data model ===
OpenHistoricalMap has a data model largely identical to that of OpenStreetMap, including the consolidation of all data into a single layer. However, OpenHistoricalMap's addition of a time dimension makes the data more complex. The tags for indicating a feature's start and end dates are much more important. There are multiple approaches to representing a real-world place or object that changes over time. It can be represented by multiple features in the database, each corresponding to different start and end dates. Alternatively, individual tags can be qualified by start and end dates, and more complex approaches involving relations have been proposed. Dates are formatted according to ISO 8601 or EDTF.

=== Coverage ===
The OpenHistoricalMap project started from scratch with an empty database. As of October 2021, OpenHistoricalMap's coverage was characterized as "very sparse" with few buildings mapped. As of 2024, a triplestore representation of OpenHistoricalMap was comparable in size to an extract of OpenStreetMap data in Finland but had many more points than polygons, and of the polygons, many were similarly shaped. OpenHistoricalMap's coverage includes multiple copies of an object as it changes over time.

== Usage ==
On the main project website, a map consisting of vector tiles visualizes the historical data interactively in several styles, including a functional Historical style and an artistic Woodblock style. A slider allows visitors to filter the map data to a point in time from 4001 BCE in the proleptic Gregorian calendar to the present day. When a feature is selected, content from Wikipedia and Wikimedia Commons is displayed in a sidebar based on the tagged Wikipedia article title or Wikidata item identifier. A custom instance of the Nominatim search engine returns search results across time periods.

OpenHistoricalMap data is available for reuse in other projects. In addition to the REST API, a weekly database dump allows bulk downloads in Protocol Buffers–encoded OSM XML format. There is also an instance of the Overpass API for structured querying of the data across time periods. These tools are configured and deployed as part of the reusable osm-seed package.

Ecologists have used OpenHistoricalMap data to track the change of geological features over time such as the path of rivers. Gramps Web uses an OpenHistoricalMap basemap to place genealogical data in a historical context.

=== Licensing terms ===
Individual features within the OpenHistoricalMap database are licensed independently. The project prefers that new contributions be dedicated to the public domain through a CC0 dedication. However, a fraction of tagged elements have been contributed under other licenses, most commonly the Open Database License (used by OpenStreetMap) and Creative Commons Attribution-ShareAlike.

The software that powers the OpenHistoricalMap website is available under the GNU General Public License.

== See also ==
- Digital humanities
- Historical geographic information system
