= GIS and environmental governance =

Tool for environmental management

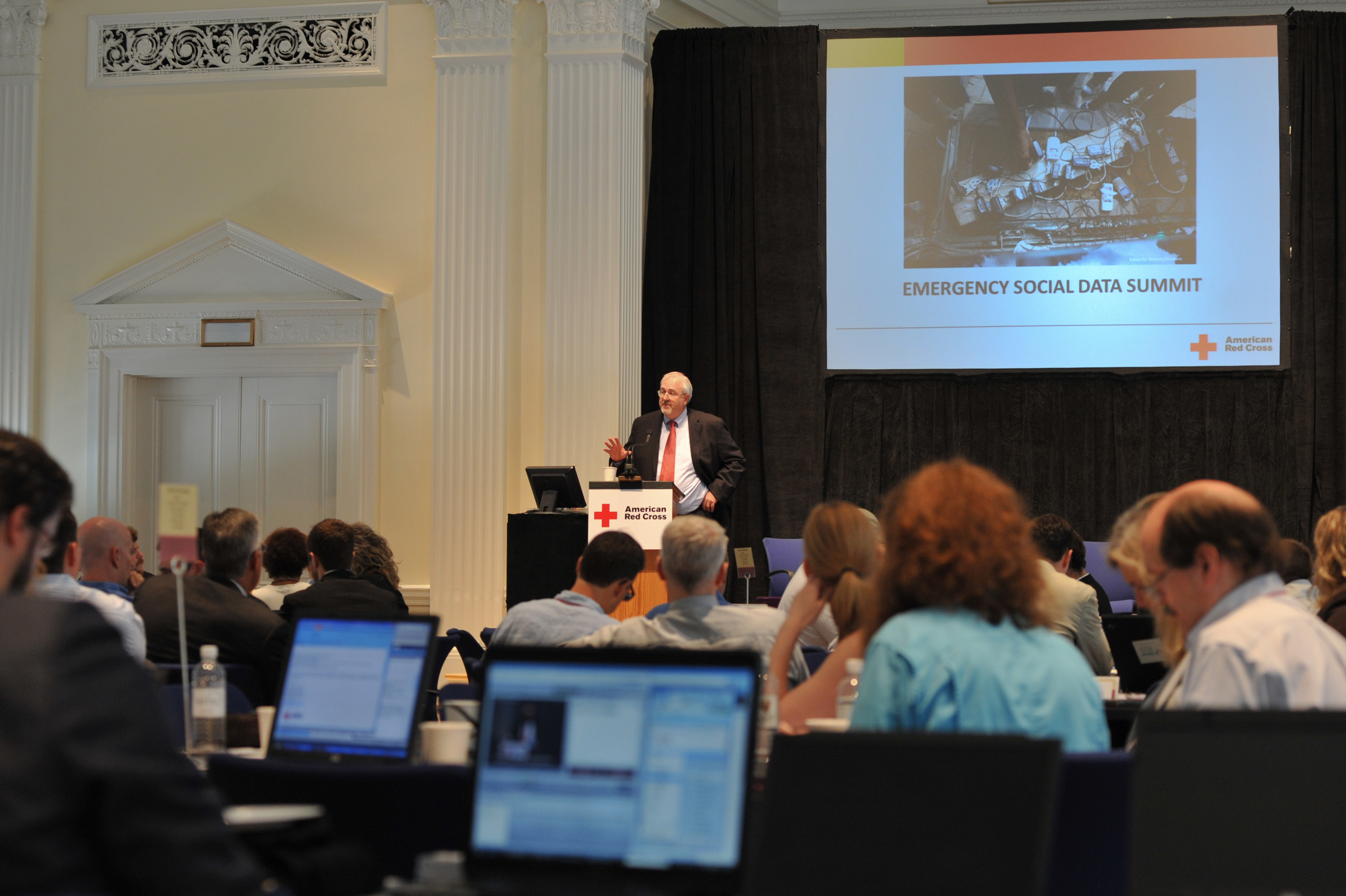
U.S. Federal Emergency Management Agency (FEMA) Administrator W. Craig Fugate speaking at a Red Cross seminar on using social media during natural disasters. GIS has an integral role to play in such agendas.

Geographic information system (GIS) is a commonly used tool for environmental management, modelling and planning. As simply defined by Michael Goodchild, GIS is as "a computer system for handling geographic information in a digital form". In recent years it has played an integral role in participatory, collaborative and open data philosophies. Social and technological evolutions have elevated digital and environmental agendas to the forefront of public policy, the global media and the private sector.

Government departments routinely use digital spatial platforms to plan and model proposed changes to road networks, building design, greenbelt land, utility provision, crime prevention, energy production, waste management and security. Non-profit organizations also incorporate geospatial and web-mapping approaches into political campaigns to lobby governments, to protest against socially or environmentally harmful companies, and to generate public support. Private business, whether in land management, resource extraction, retail, manufacturing or social media for example, also incorporate GIS into overall profit-making strategies.

== Citizen science and GIS ==
Citizen science is part of the wider emphasis upon public involvement in expert fields across Western democracies. The term is "often used to describe communities or networks of citizens who act as observers in some domain of science". Although more narrowly used to describe the shift to specifically user-generated forms of knowledge creation, it has been routinely invoked in both the public participatory GIS and environmental governance literature at large.

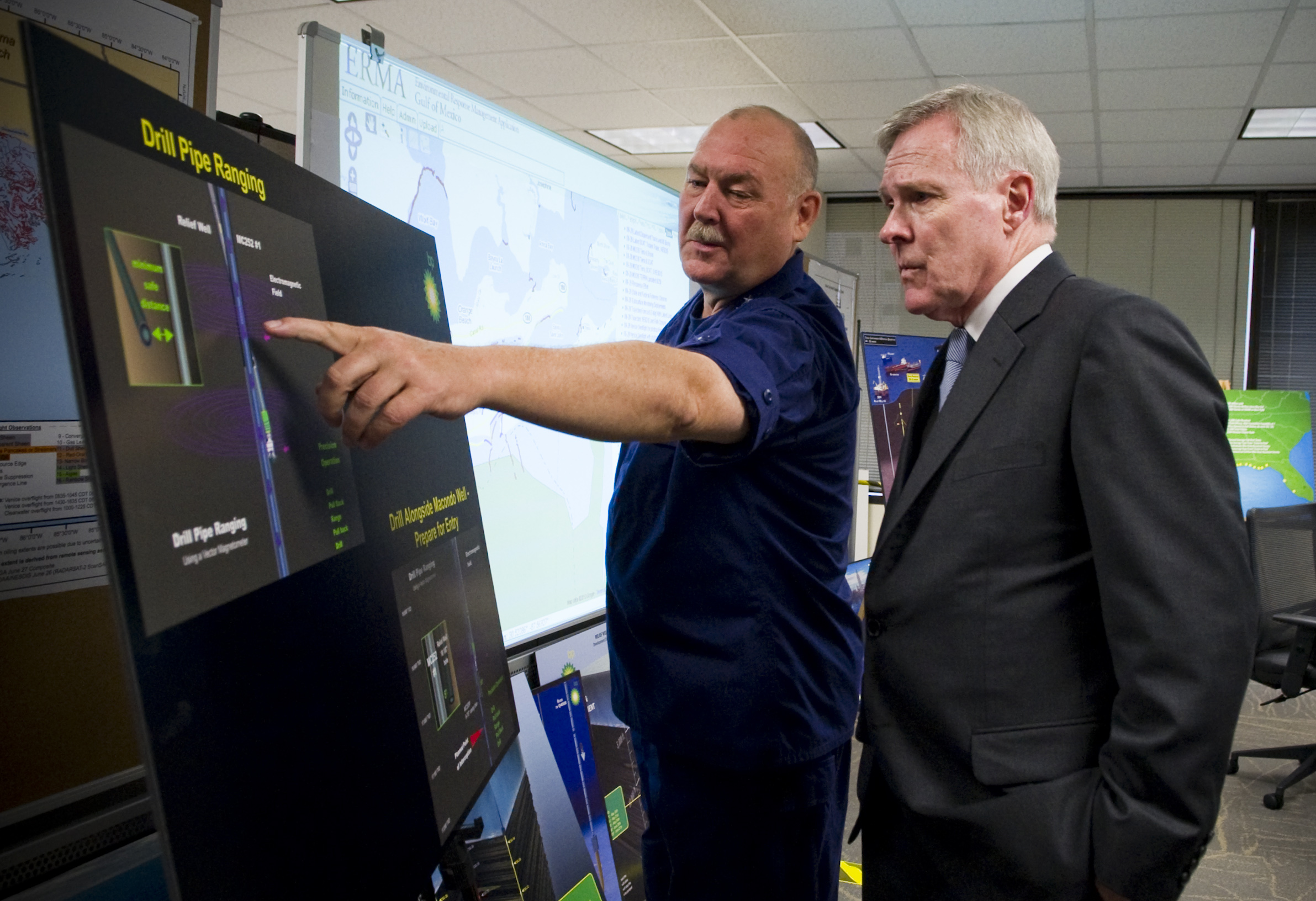
The Secretary of the US Navy, Ray Mabus is briefed on the Deepwater Horizon oil spill response. A web-based GIS is visible in the background. The NOAA-developed Environmental Response Management Application (ERMA) was designed to assist resource managers post-spill.

=== National Audubon Society: Gulf Spill Bird Tracker ===
Much of the citizen science literature is grounded in wildlife study. For example, Goodchild references the National Audubon Society's Christmas Bird Count (CBC) as a classic case of citizen science in action. Each year over the winter period, the American conservation organization encourages volunteer bird-watchers to gather information on the number of bird species in their local area. Once field data has been collected, each volunteer is able to submit their bird sightings into an online database, for the benefit of both scientific researchers and bird enthusiasts. The eBird project – enabling the general public to explore a range of map- and chart-based bird species datasets – is a result of these yearly mass volunteer events.

Of particular interest is the Gulf Spill Bird Tracker; an interactive sightings map for ten species deemed at risk from the Deepwater Horizon oil spill in 2010. Gulf Coast bird watchers were encouraged (at the time when it was live) to submit their sightings of a range of at-danger birds (such as the brown pelican, roseate spoonbill and the Wilson's plover), to help aid the clean-up operation, and pin-point beaches most affected by the oil spill. The National Audubon Society has been deeply involved in the Gulf Oil Response since the disaster, and has a dedicated program to co-ordinate resources, liaise with local government, and deploy equipment post-spill. Their 6-month report brought together some of these key factors. Not only was the National Audubon Society's citizen science initiative highlighted as the "backbone ... for understanding the [immediate] impact of the disaster", but also for long-term efforts to monitor the health of imperilled species in the Gulf Coast region. Moreover, their grassroots ethos has mobilized a vast number of Gulf volunteers to "urge elected officials and government agencies to hold polluters like BP accountable", for the financial, environmental, economic and social costs associated with such disasters. This is perhaps the most obvious example of web-based mapping software (a more "citizen-friendly" form of GIS) and environmental governance discourses colliding head on. The notion of volunteered, user-generated, citizen data is the guiding mantra for such projects, and the cornerstone of any wider attempts to lobby national governments, engage with local community groups, and generate scientific research.

=== Mapping for Change ===
Another example of citizen science and GIS in action is taken from inside the academy. University College London (UCL) and London 21 sustainability network's Mapping for Change initiative has encouraged voluntary groups, local authorities and development agencies to build map-based projects to support political, social and environmental aims. They even provide a noise mapping toolkit on the Mapping for Change website itself, designed to help local communities gather evidence of intrusive and unwanted environmental nuisances and hazards. The Royal Docks community in London has used such a toolkit to help present their concerns to the Greater London Authority Environment Committee over plans to expand London City Airport. Armed with sound meters, survey sheets and access to an online mapping platform, residents were able to monitor noise levels; from overhead planes and passing motor vehicles, to birdsong and ambient river sounds.

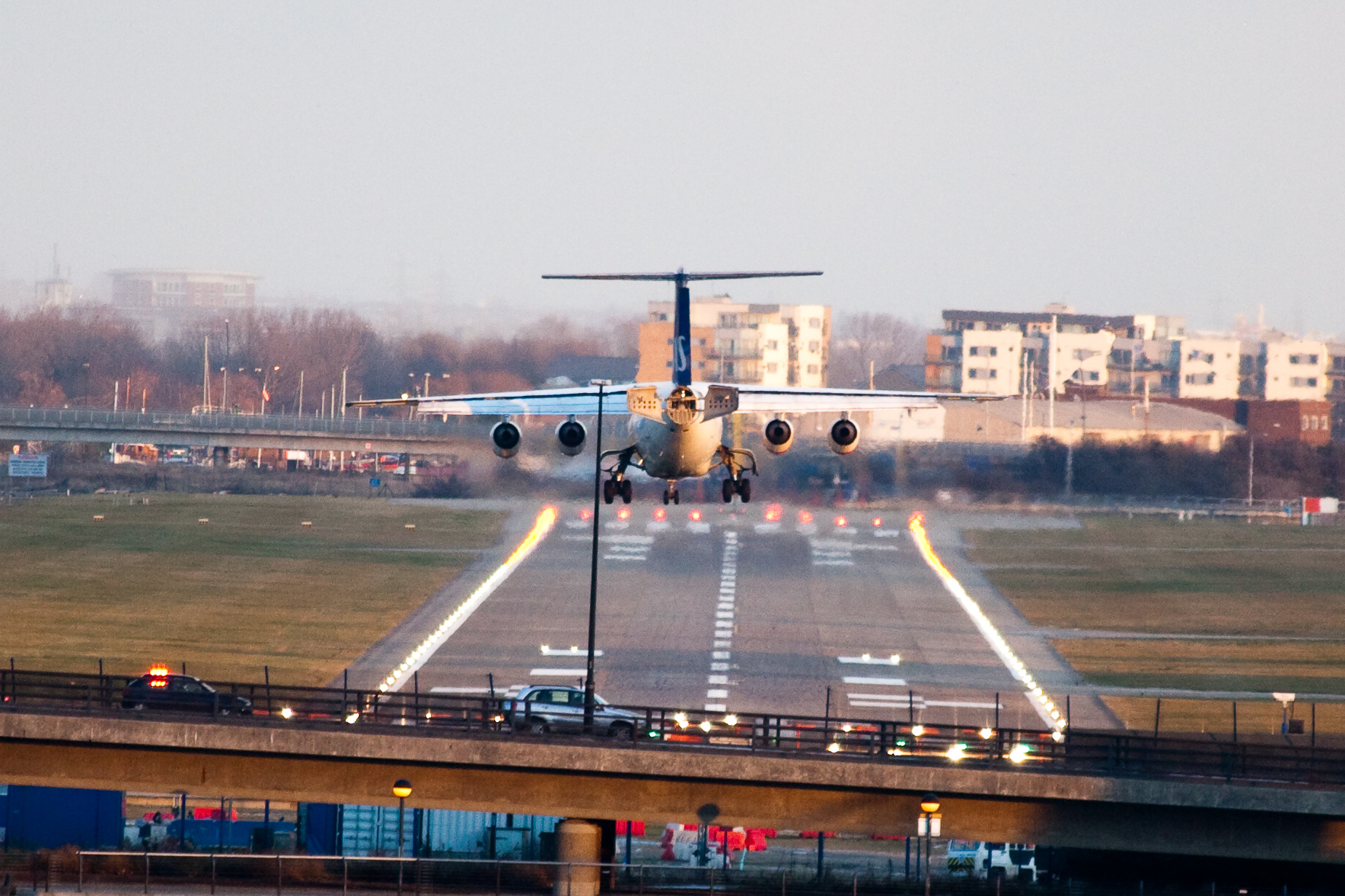
A plane lands at London City Airport. Communities in the area have used web-based noise maps to demonstrate their objections to proposed flight expansion.

Their data was then visualized in various formats to help advance their argument. Royal Docks' residents are continually plagued by planes taking-off and landing at London City Airport, and plans to expand the number of flights a year by 50% (up to 120,000) were opposed by local communities on the basis that it would decrease their quality of life.

GIS and citizen science go hand-in-hand. Web-based mapping platforms serve as useful tools for national conservation societies, local community groups and planning departments to compile tangible data on environmental issues. Voluntary, grassroots approaches can help compile lay knowledges that feed back into more formal political frameworks.

== Environmental justice ==
At a local level, GIS has been frequently used to engage stakeholders in the planning of environmentally "bad" sites. Nuclear power stations, wind farms, landfill sites, and other energy facilities are often subject to NIMBY opposition for aesthetic, health and social reasons. This is despite their capacity to produce "good" economic factors or employment opportunities. GIS has thus found itself deployed alongside broader cost-benefit analysis (CBA), and multi-criteria decision analysis (MCDA) approaches to socio-political conflict. Environmental Justice (EJ) activists believe these decisions act to further embed racial and class divides. GIS provides an important angle to the EJ movement.

=== Elements of justice ===
Broadly, the EJ movement is a loose connection of social groups, stakeholders and activists who have sought to contest socio-political injustices. Commonly, this has been through a single motive; the equal distribution of environmental goods and bads. As Schlosberg contends, "the issue of distribution is always present and always key" to the guiding EJ ethos. Yet, other demands are frequently put forward. Following Schlosberg, there are two further demands that constitute the EJ movement than a mere "[re-]distribution of environmental ills and benefits". The first is the "recognition of the diversity of participants and experiences in affected communities". Thus, EJ demands that people affected by environmental injustices are appropriately noticed by others. A lack of recognition in local community discourses, "demonstrated by various forms of insults, degradation, and devaluation", marginalize those already least able to contest political decisions. The second is the notion of participatory justice. According to Schlosberg; "if you are not recognised, you do not participate." Thus, recognitional justice leads directly to participatory justice. In EJ terms, participation is about involving those outside the typical political/institutional order. Democratic and participatory decision-making procedures are both an element of, and a condition for, social justice. Simultaneously, institutionalised exclusion, social cultures of misrecognition, and current distributional patterns can be challenged.

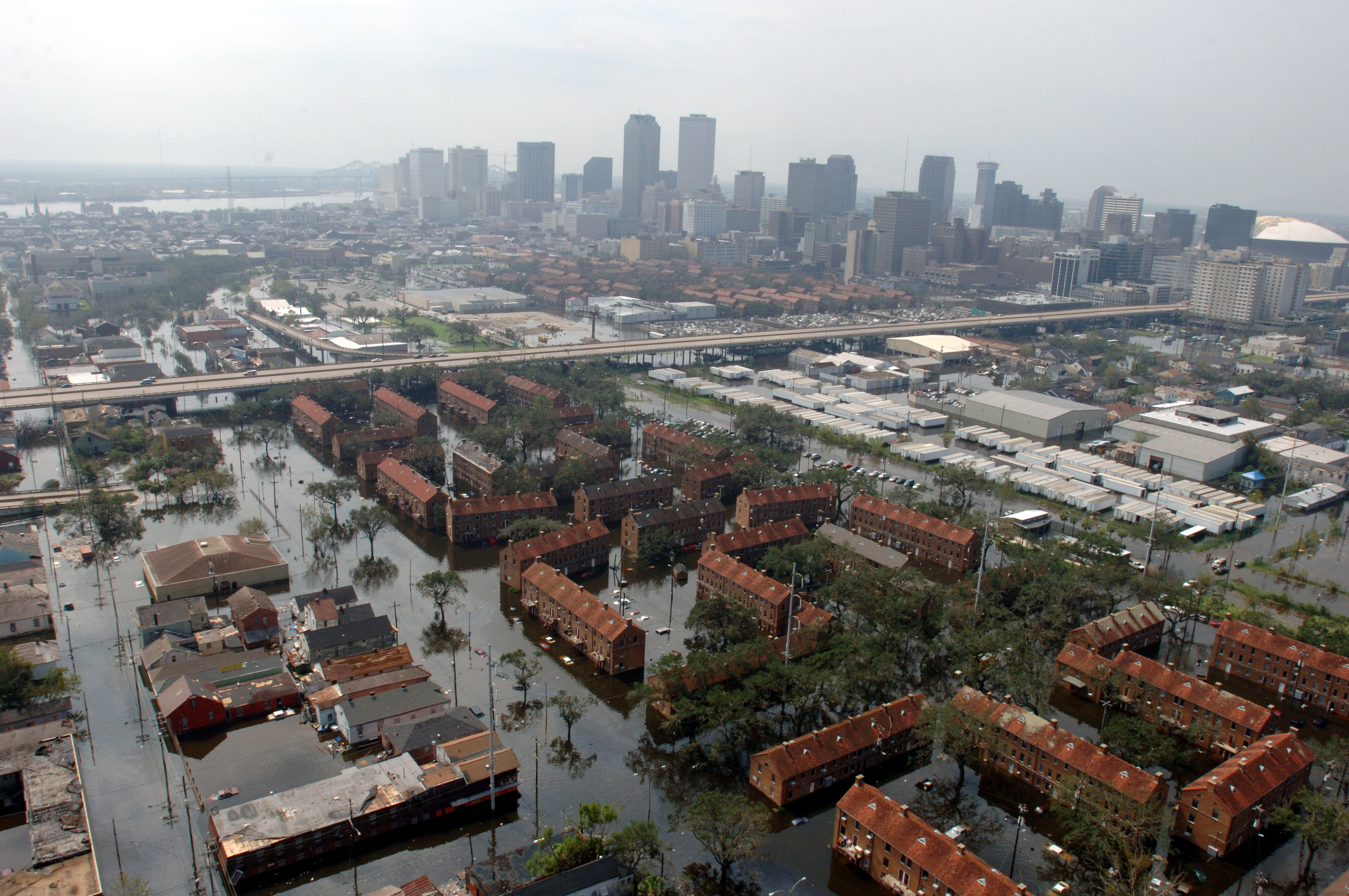
An aerial photograph of New Orleans after Hurricane Katrina in 2005. The High magnitude flood event disproportionately affected the city's poor, black neighbourhoods.

=== Flood hazards, race, & environmental justice in New York ===
Maantay and Maroko's research is intended to help hazard management and disaster planning before and after a high magnitude flood event. By using a Cadastral-based Expert Dasymetric System (CEDS) they were able to estimate the number of "vulnerable sub-populations" in the densely populated New York City area. Their research broadly supports an EJ approach to natural disaster mitigation. By highlighting the importance of equality issues and the disproportionate exposure some people have to such events, they invoke the EJ movement's notion of distributional justice. The lack of "strong social, financial, or political support structures" are constituent factors in how people deal with large-scale disasters. The criticism of the US government's response to the devastating effects of Hurricane Katrina in 2005, draw on such notions. The online publication set-up by the Social Science Research Council (SSRC) entitled Understanding Katrina helps to ground this research in socio-political approaches to so-called "natural" disasters.

Maantay and Maroko believe that GIS can have an important role in these "risk-framed" understandings. As New York is a "hyper-heterogeneous urban area", traditional administrative population data is insufficient for flood zone/population risk research. A more fine-tuned analysis is possible if tax-level datasets (based on smaller, residential units) are used instead. Maantay and Maroko use Federal Emergency Management Agency (FEMA) floodplain and tax-level datasets to determine the potential number of people at risk. A CEDS approach significantly increases the number of affected people within New York City. In using a different GIS method, Maantay and Maroko are able to better represent the impact of such flood events on minority populations. As such, their research supports all of Schlosberg's notions of distributional, recognitional and participatory justice. As noted by themselves; "the disadvantages suffered by racial and ethnic minority communities during and after disasters are due primarily to their low economic status and lack of political power". Their research broadly supports the aims of the EJ movement.

== New urban landscapes ==
GIS has also had a role in formulating new urban landscapes. Planned cities - designed entirely from scratch - routinely use digital technologies to visualize and demonstrate urban layouts, building structures and transport arrangements. Although CAD/CAM technologies are often used to assist in the visualization, construction, and delivery of certain engineering features, GIS helps to realize distinctly spatial components of the city. Environmental narratives of a "carbon-free" and sustainable future favour those in the GIS industry. "The challenge of the 21st century" as ESRI would have it, "is to arrest the progress of climate change". Geospatial software has played its part in developing this narrative.

=== Masdar City ===
Masdar City is a "sustainable, zero-carbon, zero-waste" project currently under construction in the United Arab Emirates (UAE). Situated in the Abu Dhabi emirate, Masdar is described as "an emerging global hub for renewable energy and clean technologies". The Abu Dhabi Future Energy Company have funded and overseen the 18-billion-dollar project. No cars are allowed on its streets, energy is produced in part by renewable sources, building materials are "sustainable" and water-use is controlled. GIS is being employed to plan, facilitate and test a plethora of environmental phenomena and technological processes.

A dedicated GIS team is responsible for "managing the overall spatial information needs" of the project, starting with the drawing of a common base map with which to support the city's infrastructure. Without a spatial plan of Masdar's operative mechanisms, the city will fail to deliver its grand ambition. In particular, GIS is being used to visualize, analyse and model land-use in the city. Masdar – unlike any other city – has to incorporate a wealth of energy-related facilities within its perimeter. As EJ activists are all too aware, the siting of such facilities can be a key area of conflict. Masdar's water treatment and sewage plants, material recycling centre, solar power plant, geothermal test site, solar panel test field and concrete batching plant all need to be situated inside the city's boundaries. As CH2M Hill's Site Control and GIS Manager for the Masdar project confirms; "never have so many environmental facilities come together in one place". GIS is the central tool with which to imagine – in a digital environment – different siting scenarios. In this case, GIS is seen to operate as a decision-making tool; informing the practitioners who work on the Masdar project.

GIS is also being used to model some of Masdar's key infrastructural features directly. Its involvement in simulating the citywide Personal Rapid Transport System (PRTS) is one such example. As common road vehicles are banned from the city, the "driverless" transit system will transport people and freight across the 7km2 area. GIS is capable of modelling the system route, due to comprise 85 passenger stations and approximately 1,700 automated vehicles. By drawing spatial buffer zones around potential PRTS stops, passenger-distance maps can visualize residential areas that fall outside of ideal service requirements. GIS is an instrumental tool in visualizing such problems. A smooth, functioning PRTS is a central infrastructural aspect of Masdar's grand vision, and engineering companies who specialize in GIS technologies have helped in realizing this digitally-orchestrated dream. Yet journalists in particular have been sceptical. As Bryan Walsh has argued; "will Masdar City ever really develop the authenticity of a real city?" Or as Jonathan Glancey contends, will its "ultra-modern aspects ... prove to be a mirage"?

== Post-political agendas ==
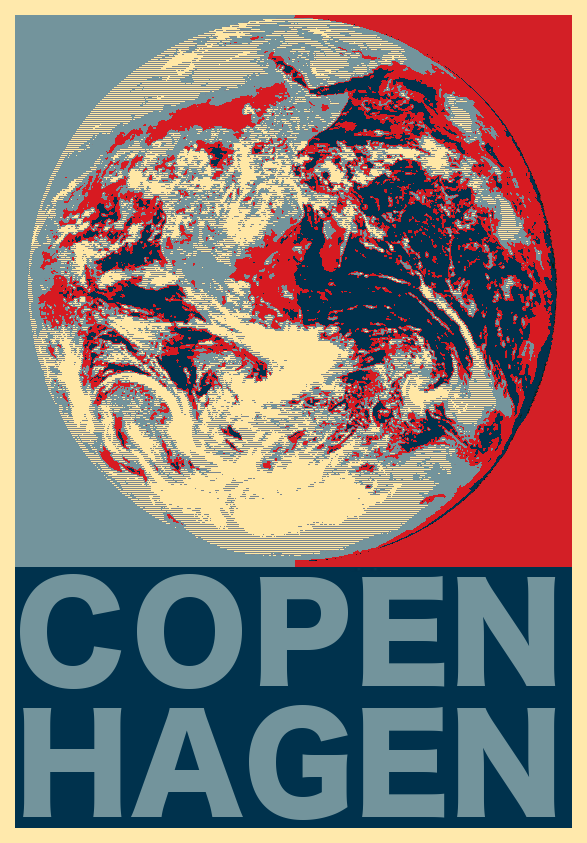
The 2009 Copenhagen Summit failed to produce a legally binding treaty on national CO2 levels, despite (or perhaps because of) a near-global delegation. An example of Jacques Ranciere's partition of the sensible in action. IPCC data, based on GIS and environmental modelling processes, provide the basis for these proposed legal frameworks.

"Post-politics" is a neologism for the consensual, participatory and techno-managerial approach to modern governance. Originally coined by Slavoj Zizek, and discussed by the likes of Jacques Rancière and Erik Swyngedouw, the post-political critique argues that life in the Western world is routinely characterized by the de-politicizing effects of a "consensual police order". A number of different techno-managerial "fixes" have been sought by neoliberal governments in order to solve expressly environmental problems, rather than due political processes. As Swyngedouw has argued, such forces have "replaced debate, disagreement and dissensus with a series of technologies of governing that fuse around consensus, agreement, accountancy merits and technocratic environmental management". Thus if the rise of the post-political order is due to the increasing reliance upon "technocratic environmental management", as Swyngedouw has argued, then GIS – as a tool for neoliberal environmental governance – is implicit in such an order.

=== The police, the political and politics ===
Firstly, it serves to elucidate upon claims to a "post-political impasse". This is best understood through what Ranciere calls the police, the political and politics. It is within these three terms that Ranciere carves out what he calls the true meaning of political action, and of what it is to exercise political right. As Panagia neatly summarizes; "politics is the practice of asserting one's position that ruptures the logic of arche". Politics is about rediscovering the art of debate, conflict and struggle, and not merely about re-organizing the administrative framework of existing political structures (namely, the state apparatus). The political – in Ranciere's words – is for "the one who is 'unaccounted-for', the one who has no speech to be heard". Democracy does not work towards an "idealized-normative condition" of equal rights, but is built upon the very ontological notion of such. Politics brings the political into the foreground; rendering that which was previously noise, legitimate speech. Much of what is thought to be politics in the contemporary world is actually subsumed within the police. Policy is not politics is this sense, then. This is what Ranciere calls the partition of the sensible, or the established order of things.

The post-politics of contemporary governance brings all that it can into this order. Those who were previously cast outside the police structure are now "'responsible' partners" in a stakeholder-based arrangement. All views that were previously antagonistic and conflictual are now brought together in a more homely, consensual arena. No room is made for "irrational" demands. As such, Ranciere says that, "consensus is the reduction of politics to the police". Nowhere has this been more visible than within the apocalyptic climate narratives told ad infinitum by environmental practitioners, policy-makers and non-governmental organizations. Consensual politics has found its home in the environmental arena.

=== Post-political GIS ===
In short, GIS works as a tool for mediating and diffusing socio-environmental conflicts. It does so by working within Ranciere's notion of the partition of the sensible. Whilst it may allow previously unheard voices to gain a voice (in environmental justice campaigns, foremostly), it still does not – as a tool of neoliberal governance – make room for those who are deemed "outside", unruly or conflictual to have a voice. For example, Elwood laments the notionally "participatory" flag-waving carried out by those involved in urban GIS-based projects. As she says, "the skills and financial and temporal costs of using GIS effectively bar many individuals, social groups and organizations from participation in research and decision-making where it is used", denying those without the means to participate, from participation. GIS does not necessarily facilitate involvement for all.

Moreover, GIS is limited in its ontological scope, reducing all things spatial to a calculable order. As Leszczynski contends, GIS operates a "discourse populated by discrete objects of knowledge"; differentiating "between the binary of truth and error". GIS is thus a central polic-ing tool for contemporary socio-environmental governance. It works to order space into discrete and ordered formats. As Jeremy Crampton points out, "the basic model of the world in GIScience texts is: points, lines, areas, surfaces and volumes", ill-prepared to deal with non-discrete, continuous environmental phenomena. All that does not fit into this order is left aside. GIS thus excludes that which cannot be "structured accordingly", excluding epistemologies that do not neatly fit into the formal computing framework; a formal framework synonymous with "the accountancy calculus of risk and the technologies of expert administration". The apparatus of choice for the techno-enviro-managerialist, if Ranciere and Swyngedouw's analyses are to be put forward, and Elwood, Crampton and Leszczynski's criticisms are to be accepted, is GIS.

== See also ==
- Citizen science
- Counter-mapping
- Emergency management
- Geographic information system
- Geographic information systems in geospatial intelligence
- Public participation
- Public participation geographic information system
- Urban planning
