= Neogeography =

Amateur-focused geography

Neogeography (literally "new geography") is the use of geographical techniques and tools for personal and community activities or by a non-expert group of users. Application domains of neogeography are typically not formal or analytical.

== History ==
The term neogeography has been used since at least 1922. In the early 1950s in the U.S. it was a term used in the sociology of work. The French philosopher François Dagognet used it in the title of his 1977 book Une Epistemologie de l'espace concret: Neo-geographie. The word was first used in relation to the study of online communities in the 1990s by Kenneth Dowling, the Librarian of the City and County of San Francisco. Immediate precursor terms in the industry press were: "the geospatial Web" and "the geoaware Web" (both 2005); "Where 2.0" (2005); "a dissident cartographic aesthetic" and "mapping and counter-mapping" (2006). These terms arose with the concept of Web 2.0, around the increased public appeal of mapping and geospatial technologies that occurred with the release of such tools as "slippy maps" such as Google Maps, Google Earth, and also with the decreased cost of geolocated mobile devices such as GPS units. Subsequently, the use of geospatial technologies began to see increased integration with non-geographically focused applications.

The term neogeography was first defined in its contemporary sense by Randall Szott in 2006. He argued for a broad scope, to include artists, psychogeography, and more. The technically oriented aspects of the field, far more tightly defined than in Scott's definition, were outlined by Andrew Turner in his Introduction to Neogeography (O'Reilly, 2006). The contemporary use of the term, and the field in general, owes much of its inspiration to the locative media movement that sought to expand the use of location-based technologies to encompass personal expression and society.

Traditional Geographic Information Systems historically have developed tools and techniques targeted towards formal applications that require precision and accuracy. By contrast, neogeography tends to apply to the areas of approachable, colloquial applications. The two realms can have overlap as the same problems are presented to different sets of users: experts and non-experts.

== User-generated geographic content ==
Neogeography has also been connected with the increase in user-generated geographic content, closely related to Volunteered Geographic Information. This can be an active collection of data such as OpenStreetMap or passive collection of user-data such as Flickr tags for folksonomic toponyms. While involving non-trained volunteers in the data creation process, research proves users perceive volunteered geographic information as highly valuable and trustworthy.

== Discussion about the definition ==
There is currently much debate about the scope and application of neogeography in the web mapping, geography, and GIS fields. Some of this discussion considers neogeography to be the ease of use of geographic tools and interfaces while other points focus on the domains of application.

Neogeography is not limited to a specific technology and is not strictly web-based, so is not synonymous with web mapping though it is commonly conceived as such.

A number of geographers and geoinformatics scientists (such as Mike Goodchild) have expressed strong reservations about the term "neogeography". They say that geography is an established scientific discipline; uses such as mashups and tags in Google Earth are not scientific works, but are better described as Volunteered Geographic Information.

Many artists and inter-disciplinary practitioners are involved in new forms of mapping and locative art.

== See also ==
- Cartography
- Collaborative Mapping
- Geography Markup Language
- GeoRSS
- Geoweb
- Google Earth
- GPS eXchange Format
- Keyhole Markup Language
- Locative media
- OpenStreetMap
- Participatory 3D Modelling (P3DM)
- Participatory GIS
- Soundmap
- Spatial citizenship
- Technical geography
- Volunteered geographic information
- Web mapping
