= Spatial citizenship =

Spatial citizenship describes the ability of individuals and groups to interact and participate in societal spatial decision making through the reflexive production and use of geo-media (geographic media such as maps, virtual globes, GIS, and the Geoweb). Spatial citizens are lay users who are able to use geo-media to question existing perspectives on action in space (e.g. social rules, spatial planning) and to produce, communicate, and negotiate alternative spatial visions.

Spatial citizenship is an educational approach at the intersection of citizenship education and geography education. Its main theoretical reference points are emancipatory forms of citizenship and the "reflexive appropriation of space".

== Reference points in citizenship education ==
Spatial citizenship can be distinguished from traditional citizenship education approaches in many respects:

- Spatial citizenship respects multiple institutional and locational setups. It is de-linked from traditional national "citizenship" as it is not tied to the nation or local state as predefined spatial entities. Spatial citizenship is based upon the principles of human rights and democratic negotiation to ensure a basis for conciliation and compromise. It is based on the concept of activist citizenship (in contrast to active citizenship) formulated by Katharyne Mitchell and Sarah Elwood, who challenge unquestioned social rules that limit participation.
- Spatial citizenship refers to an open and flexible conception of social institutions. It supplants the notion of belonging to one specific place with the notion of belonging to multiple and fluid communities that may or may not be linked with a particular location on the Earth's surface. Angharad Stephens and Vicki Squire have argued that societal negotiation processes have shifted away from fixed communities due to new information technologies.
- Spatial citizenship draws special attention to web communities and geo-social networks. A spatial citizen is a 'self-actualizing citizen' who, in contrast to the 'dutiful citizen' concept of the past, is able to use Web 2.0 and cloud-based applications to compare different and potentially contradicting information sources and communicate his/her own alternative ideas via collaborative web tools.

== Reference points in social geography: appropriation of space ==
Spatial citizenship has become a conceptual reference point in theories of action-oriented social geography and new cultural geography. These approaches contend that human beings constantly appropriate spaces, as they attach meanings to geographically located physical matter in order to prepare it for their own actions.

In these theories, spaces are regarded as being socially constructed. To a large extent, the attachment of meaning works unconsciously, following socially accepted, mainstream categories and discourses. Meanings given to physical objects determine the actions deemed possible. For instance, a field of asphalt in a city centre might have multiple meanings: it may be interpreted as a parking area as well as a place for ball games, with both meanings competing for dominance. As soon as one meaning becomes superior, which is a result of social power relations, the other meaning may decline, become invisible, and eventually is not used anymore. The superiority of a specific meaning over another one might be supported by artifacts representing meanings attached, such as signs on buildings, structural modifications of the physical environment, or symbols and explanations of the socio-cultural significance of places and objects in spatial representations visualized via geo-media.

A mature appropriation of space therefore includes the conscious attachment of meaning as well as awareness of meanings being attached to places by others. It includes a sensibility to the multitude of meanings transported and hidden by a mainstream discourse. Keys to the mature appropriation of space are therefore the deconstruction of socially produced meanings, as well as the ability to communicate one's own, potentially contradictory meanings and negotiate them with others. This process is often mediated through the formation of a collective spatialized identity. Given that space – its uses and symbolic significance – is often the site of social and political struggle, it becomes the container for action while at the same time shaping the group development of an "us". In particular, when groups re-imagine public space for political usages, this expression of spatial citizenship is the outcome of a spatially informed collective identity.

== Spatial citizenship in the geoinformation society ==
Geographic media (geo-media) are especially important for attaching meaning to places as they clearly connect location, information and visualization. In addition to this, geo-media represent mainly single meanings out of the many that are possible. Nowadays, geo-media have become more and more present in everyday life due to mobile computing in combination with Geoweb applications. For instance, maps on smart phones guide people in their everyday actions, but at the same time limit their opportunities for action by limiting the variety of potential meanings.

Scholars of spatial citizenship understand geo-media as instruments of reflection and communication.

- Reflection on geo-media means reflecting on the limitations of previously given meanings by using theories of critical cartography to ask which aspects of potential relevance for a certain spatial problem or decision making are included and excluded in the given meanings. At the same time, self-reflection requires being aware of one's own, subjective hypothesis construction while using geo-media. Both aspects allow for a more mature appropriation of space with geo-media, while being aware of and gaining insight into the construction process of meanings attached to space.
- Communication with geo-media means communicating using spatial representations. Thanks to user-friendly web mapping tools within the Geoweb, users (prosumers) can easily produce their own geo-media and share it web-wide. Collaboration features allow for the negotiation of constructions of space with other users, for example through volunteered geographic information (VGI). The study of spatial citizenship examines subjectivity, impact on everyday action, social power relations, competition, and negotiation in VGI. Spatial citizenship also aims at increasing awareness of geographic information produced involuntarily by users through automatic data collection that many Geoweb platforms (especially mobile phones) include to support the interests of service providers (see location-based services).

== Education ==
The goal of education for spatial citizenship is to enable learners to achieve a reflexive appropriation of space as the basis for mature action in space by reflective geo-media use and active, reflective geo-media production. Using a broad variety of learning environments oriented toward the learners' needs, the educational approach of spatial citizenship is applicable at different levels from primary to tertiary education. Apart from technological proficiency, spatial citizenship education aims at two additional main competencies:

- Being able to achieve a reflective use of geo-media, while understanding the process of the social construction of spaces, with the result of either consciously accepting given meanings or producing alternative meanings.
- Being able to communicate alternative meanings effectively with geo-media and using geo-media as instruments to support argumentation in negotiation processes on contradictory meanings.

== Scientific response ==
The European Commission-funded project SPACIT furthers education for spatial citizenship by developing teacher training standards, curricula, and learning modules for teacher education. Another EU-funded project, digital-earth.eu, linked with the SPACIT project by connecting stakeholders using or interested in using geo-media in education. It supported spatial citizenship through the creation of educational standards, the collection of best-practice examples, and the provision of learning environments applicable to teachers in everyday classroom situations. Digital-earth.eu also promoted these concepts related to spatial citizenship in political circles concerned with the development of the Europe2020 goals.
