= Volunteered geographic information =

Type of user-generated content

Volunteered geographic information (VGI) is the harnessing of tools to create, assemble, and disseminate geographic data provided voluntarily by individuals. VGI is a special case of the larger phenomenon known as user-generated content, and allows people to have a more active role in activities such as urban planning and mapping.

== Overview ==
VGI can be seen as an extension of critical and participatory approaches to geographic information systems. Some examples of this phenomenon are WikiMapia, OpenStreetMap, and Yandex.Map editor. These sites provide general base map information and allow users to create their own content by marking locations where various events occurred or certain features exist, but aren't already shown on the base map. Other examples include 311-style request systems and 3D spatial technology. Additionally, VGI commonly populates the content offered through location-based services such as the restaurant review site Yelp.

One of the most important elements of VGI in contrast to standard user-generated content is the geographic element, and its relationship with collaborative mapping. The information volunteered by the individual is linked to a specific geographic region. While this is often taken to relate to elements of traditional cartography, VGI offers the possibility of including subjective, emotional, or other non-cartographic information.

Geo-referenced data produced within services such as Trip Advisor, Flickr, Twitter, Instagram and Panoramio can be considered as VGI.

VGI has attracted concerns about data quality, and specifically about its credibility and the possibility of vandalism.

== Criticism of the term ==
The term VGI has been criticized for poorly representing common variations in the data of OpenStreetMap and other sites: that some of the data is paid, in the case of CloudMade's ambassadors, or generated by another entity, as in US Census data.

Because it is gathered by individuals with no formal training, the quality and reliability of VGI is a topic of much debate. Some methods of quality assurance have been tested, namely, the use of control data to verify VGI accuracy.

== Effects on users ==
While there is concern over the authority of the data, VGI may provide benefits beyond that of professional geographic information (PGI), partly due to its ability to collect and present data not collected or curated by traditional/professional sources. Additionally, VGI provides positive emotional value to users in functionality, satisfaction, social connection and ethics.

== See also ==
- Crowdsourcing
- Neogeography
- Participatory 3D modelling (P3DM)
- Participatory GIS
- Public participation
- Public participation geographic information system (PPGIS)
- Traditional knowledge GIS
- Web mapping
