= Collaborative mapping =

Aggregation of web mapping and user content

Collaborative mapping, also known as citizen mapping, is the aggregation of Web mapping and user-generated content, from a group of individuals or entities, and can take several distinct forms. With the growth of technology for storing and sharing maps, collaborative maps have become competitors to commercial services, in the case of OpenStreetMap, or components of them, as in Google Map Maker, Waze and Yandex Map Editor.

Volunteers collect geographic information and the citizens/individuals can be regarded as sensors within a geographical environment that create, assemble, and disseminate geographic data provided voluntarily by the individuals. Collaborative mapping is a special case of the larger phenomenon known as crowd sourcing, that allows citizens to be part of collaborative approach to accomplish a goal. The goals in collaborative mapping have a geographical aspect, e.g. having a more active role in urban planning. Especially when data, information, knowledge is distributed in a population and an aggregation of data is not available, then collaborative mapping can bring a benefit for the citizens or activities in a community with an e-Planing Platform. Extensions of critical and participatory approaches to geographic information systems combines software tools with a joint activities to accomplish a community goal. Additionally, the aggregated data can be used for a Location-based service like available public transport options at the geolocation where a mobile device is currently used (GPS-sensor). The relevance for the user at a specific geolocation cannot be represented with logic value in general (relevant=true/false). The relevance can be represented with Fuzzy-Logic or a Fuzzy architectural spatial analysis.

== Types ==
Collaborative mapping applications vary depending on which feature the collaborative edition takes place: on the map itself (shared surface), or on overlays to the map. A very simple collaborative mapping application would just plot users' locations (social mapping or geosocial networking) or Wikipedia articles' locations (Placeopedia). Collaborative implies the possibility of edition by several distinct individuals so the term would tend to exclude applications where the maps are not meant for the general user to modify.

In this kind of application, the map itself is created collaboratively by sharing a common surface. For example, both OpenStreetMap and WikiMapia allow for the creation of single 'points of interest', as well as linear features and areas. Collaborative mapping and specifically surface sharing faces the same problems as revision control, namely concurrent access issues and versioning. In addition to these problems, collaborative maps must deal with the difficult issue of cluttering, due to the geometric constraints inherent in the media. One approach to this problem is using overlays, allowing to suitable use in consumer services. Despite these issues, collaborative mapping platforms such as OpenStreetMap can be considered as being as trustworthy as professionally produced maps

Overlays group together items on a map, allowing the user of the map to toggle the overlay's visibility and thus all items contained in the overlay. The application uses map tiles from a third-party (for example one of the mapping APIs) and adds its own collaboratively edited overlays to them, sometimes in a wiki fashion. If each user's revisions are contained in an overlay, the issue of revision control and cluttering can be mitigated. One example of this is the accessibility platform Accessadvisr, which utilises collaborative mapping to inform persons of accessibility issues, which is perceived to be as reliable and trustworthy as professional information.

Other overlays-based collaborative mapping tools follow a different approach and focus on user centered content creation and experience. There users enrich maps with their own points of interest and build kind of travel books for themselves. At the same time users can explore overlays of other users as collaborative extension.

== Humanitarian collaborative mapping ==
Humanitarian OpenStreetMap Team, based on OpenStreetMap, provides collaborative mapping support for humanitarian objectives, e.g. collaborative transportation map, epidemiological mapping for Malaria, earthquake response, or typhoon response.

== Collaborative robotic mapping ==
In robot navigation, 3-dimensional maps can be reconstructed collaboratively using simultaneous localization and mapping.

== Private local collaboration using maps ==
Some mapping companies offer an online mapping tool that allows private collaboration between users when mapping sensitive data on digital maps, e.g.:

- Google Maps
- Wegovnow: a map based platform to engage the local civic society – local collaboration & publishing with maps
- Canvis.app - a platform that allows you to easily generate, customize, and share a collaborative mapping campaign. Suitable for large scale crowdsourcing projects.
- Murmurations provides a collaborative mapping framework which leverages the collective effort of multiple mappers to produce customisable maps and directories from decentralised, interoperable Profiles.

== Quality assurance ==
If citizens or a community collects data, information (like Wikipedia, Wikiversity) then concerns come up about data quality, and specifically about its credibility. The same aspects of quality assurance are relevant for collaborative mapping and the possibility of vandalism.

== Data collection tools ==
Collaborative mapping is not restricted to the application of mobile devices but if data is captured with a mobile device the satellite navigation (like GPS is helpful to assign the current geolocation to the collected data at the geolocation. Open Source tools like ODK are used to collect the mapping data (e.g. about health care facilities or humanitarian operations) with a survey that could automatically insert the geolocation into the survey data that could include visual information (e.g. images, videos) and audio samples collected at the current geolocation. An image can be used e.g. as additional information of damage assessment after an earth quake.

=== Restricted visibility of alterations ===
These sites provide general base map information and allow users to create their own content by marking locations where various events occurred or certain features exist, but aren't already shown on the base map. Some examples include 311-style request systems and 3D spatial technology.

=== Public alterations and quality assured versions ===
The openness for changes to the community is possible for all individuals and the community is validating changes by putting regions and location at their personal watchlist. Any changes in the joint repository of the mapping process are captured by a version control system- Reverting changes is possible and specific quality assured versions of specific areas can be marked as reference map for a specific area (like permanent links in Wikipedia). Quality assurance can be implemented on different scales:

- version of complete map,
- version of selected regions/area,
- version of mapping attributes a Point of Interest (e.g. hospital marked as "under construction" is providing health care services)

Blockchain can be used as integrity check of alterations or digital signature can be used to mark a certain version as "quality assured" by the institution that signed a map as digital file or digital content.

== See also ==
- Category:Collaborative mapping
- Category:Virtual globes
- Category:Web mapping
- Online cadastral map
- Comparison of commercial GPS software
- Comparison of web map services
- Counter-mapping
- List of wikis
- Neogeography
- Participatory 3D modelling
- Participatory GIS
- Public participation GIS
- Virtual globe
- Volunteered geographic information
- Humanitarian OpenStreetMap Team
