= Five Billion Years of Change =

2003 book by Denis Wood

- Author: Denis Wood
- Language: English
- Genre: Non-fiction
- Publisher: Guilford Press
- Publication date: 2003
- ISBN: 157230958X

Five Billion Years of Change: A History of the Land (2003, ISBN 157230958X) is a book by Denis Wood that attempts a holistic view of reality that ranges from the Big Bang to the World Wide Web. Specifically, this books deals with the formation of various structures:

- the universe
- the Earth and its atmosphere, oceans, and continents
- the origin of life
- the evolution of humans
- the development of agriculture
- the rise and fall of civilizations
- contemporary globalization

A key theme is repeated through this book: humans have a tendency to divide our understandings into "history" and "prehistory". People are shocked when some event from prehistory intrudes upon their current lives; Wood likens the shock of this intrusion to an expulsion from the Garden of Eden. This division is a metaphor for various artificial divisions; for example:

- the formation of the Earth, the pre-biotic chemistry, and the origin of life
- before the Industrial Revolution and our subsequent modern era

Instead of thinking in terms of artificial divisions of "now" and "back then", readers should develop an intuitive mindset of graduated changes in which the "fossils" of the ancient past are intermingled with contemporary objects; for instance, the "oxygen holocaust" of the paleoproterozoic eon exists in today's oxygen-rich atmosphere.

Also, the heroic saga induces another faulty thinking style that obscures the true nature of the world. To understand the real story of humanity, Wood argues that people must focus on the mass actions of people or of large impersonal forces rather than a few heroes or kings. Hollywood movies dealing with ecological threats are especially misleading; rather than imparting an accurate image of ecological issues, movies present a villain such as a mad scientist or a greedy, evil business person. Instead, such entertainment and much news reporting distracts us from our individual actions that are at the heart of ecological problems.

Inaccurate ways of thinking induce a passive helplessness. Instead, by presenting a sweeping story of successive, interlinked, long term trends, the author hopes to give readers a flexible, authentic model of the world. With that model, readers will be capable of understanding (and possibly dealing with) current global challenges.
