= Counter-mapping =

Mapping by communities to contest state maps

Counter-mapping is the creation of maps that challenge "dominant power structures, to further seemingly progressive goals". Counter-mapping is used in multiple disciplines to reclaim colonized territory. Counter-maps are prolific in indigenous cultures, "counter-mapping may reify, reinforce, and extend settler boundaries even as it seeks to challenge dominant mapping practices; and still, counter-mapping may simultaneously create conditions of possibility for decolonial ways of representing space and place." The term came into use in the United States when Nancy Peluso used it in 1995 to describe the commissioning of maps by forest users in Kalimantan, Indonesia, to contest government maps of forest areas that undermined indigenous interests. The resultant counter-hegemonic maps strengthen forest users' resource claims. There are numerous expressions closely related to counter-mapping: ethnocartography, alternative cartography, mapping-back, counter-hegemonic mapping, deep mapping and public participatory mapping. Moreover, the terms critical cartography, subversive cartography, bio-regional mapping, and remapping are sometimes used interchangeably with counter-mapping, but in practice encompass much more.

Whilst counter-mapping still refers to indigenous mapping, it is increasingly being applied to non-indigenous mapping in economically developed countries. Such counter-mapping has been facilitated by processes of neoliberalism, and technological democratisation. Examples of counter-mapping include attempts to demarcate and protect traditional territories, community mapping, public participation geographic information systems, and mapping by a relatively weak state to counter the resource claims of a stronger state. The power of counter-maps to advocate policy change in a bottom-up manner led commentators to affirm that counter-mapping should be viewed as a tool of governance.

Despite its emancipatory potential, counter-mapping has not gone without criticism. There is a tendency for counter-mapping efforts to overlook the knowledge of women, minorities, and other vulnerable, disenfranchised groups. From this perspective, counter-mapping is only empowering for a small subset of society, whilst others become further marginalised.

== Origins ==
Nancy Peluso, professor of forest policy, coined the term 'counter-mapping' in 1995, having examined the implementation of two forest mapping strategies in Kalimantan. One set of maps belonged to state forest managers, and the international financial institutions that supported them, such as the World Bank. This strategy recognised mapping as a means of protecting local claims to territory and resources to a government that had previously ignored them. The other set of maps had been created by Indonesian NGOs, who often contract international experts to assist with mapping village territories. The goal of the second set of maps was to co-opt the cartographic conventions of the Indonesian state, to legitimise the claims by the Dayak people, indigenous to Kalimantan, to the rights to forest use. Counter-mappers in Kalimantan have acquired GIS technologies, satellite technology, and computerised resource management tools, consequently making the Indonesian state vulnerable to counter-maps. As such, counter-mapping strategies in Kalimantan have led to successful community action to block, and protest against, oil palm plantations and logging concessions imposed by the central government.

It must, however, be recognised that counter-mapping projects existed long before the coinage of the term. Counter-maps are rooted in map art practices that date to the early 20th century; in the mental maps movement of the 1960s; in indigenous and bioregional mapping; and parish mapping.

=== Parish Maps Project ===
In 1985, the charity Common Ground launched the Parish Maps Project, a bottom-up initiative encouraging local people to map elements of the environment valued by their parish. Since then, more than 2,500 English parishes have made such maps. Parish mapping projects aim to put every local person in an 'expert' role. Sue Clifford exemplifies this notion, affirming: "making a parish map is about creating a community expression of values, and about beginning to assert ideas for involvement. It is about taking the place in your own hands". The final map product is typically an artistic artefact, usually painted, and often displayed in village halls or schools. By questioning the biases of cartographic conventions and challenging predominant power effects of mapping, The Parish Maps Project is an early example of what Peluso went on to term 'counter-mapping'

== Development ==
=== Neoliberalism ===
The development of counter-mapping can be situated within the neoliberal political-economic restructuring of the state. Prior to the 1960s, equipping a map-making enterprise was chiefly the duty of a single agency, funded by the national government. In this sense, maps have conventionally been the products of privileged knowledges. However, processes of neoliberalism, predominantly since the late 1970s, have reconfigured the state's role in the cartographic project. Neoliberalism denotes an emphasis on markets and minimal states, whereby individual choice is perceived to have replaced the mass-production of commodities. The fact that citizens are now performing cartographic functions that were once exclusively state-controlled can be partially explained through a shift from "roll-back neoliberalism", in which the state dismantled some of its functions, to "roll-out neoliberalism", in which new modes of operating have been constructed. In brief, the state can be seen to have "hollowed out" and delegated some of its mapping power to citizens.

==== Counter-mapping as neoliberal governmentality ====
Governmentality refers to a particular form of state power that is exercised when citizens self-discipline by acquiescing to state knowledge. Historically, cartography has been a fundamental governmentality strategy, a technology of power, used for surveillance and control. Competing claimants and boundaries made no appearance on state-led maps. This links to Foucault's notion of "subjugated knowledges" - ones that did not rise to the top, or were disqualified. However, through neoliberalising processes, the state has retracted from performing some of its cartographic functions. Consequently, rather than being passive recipients of top-down map distribution, people now have the opportunity to claim sovereignty over the mapping process. In this new regime of neoliberal cartographic governmentality the "insurrection of subjugated knowledges" occurs, as counter-mapping initiatives incorporate previously marginalised voices.

=== Technological democratisation? ===
In response to technological change, predominantly since the 1980s, cartography has increasingly been democratised. The wide availability of high-quality location information has enabled mass-market cartography based on Global Positioning System receivers, home computers, and the internet. The fact that civilians are using technologies which were once elitist led Brosius et al.. to assert that counter-mapping involves "stealing the master's tools". Nevertheless, numerous early counter-mapping projects successfully utilised manual techniques, and many still use them. For instance, in recent years, the use of simple sketch mapping approaches has been revitalised, whereby maps are made on the ground, using natural materials. Similarly, the use of scale model constructions and felt boards, as means of representing cartographic claims of different groups, have become increasingly popular. Consequently, Wood et al. assert that counter-mappers can "make gateau out of technological crumbs".

==== Public Participation Geographical Information Systems ====
In recent years, Public Participation Geographical Information Systems (PPGIS) have attempted to take the power of the map out of the hands of the cartographic elite, putting it into the hands of the people. For instance, Kyem designed a PPGIS method termed Exploratory Strategy for Collaboration, Management, Allocation, and Planning (ESCMAP). The method sought to integrate the concerns and experiences of three rural communities in the Ashanti Region of Ghana into official forest management practices. Kyem concluded that, notwithstanding the potential of PPGIS, it is possible that the majority of the rich and powerful people in the area would object to some of the participatory uses of GIS. For example, loggers in Ghana affirmed that the PPGIS procedures were too open and democratic. Thus, despite its democratising potential, there are barriers to its implementation. More recently, Wood et al.. disputed the notion of PPGIS entirely, affirming that it is "scarcely GIS, intensely hegemonic, hardly public, and anything but participatory".

== Counter-mapping as governance ==
Governance makes problematic state-centric notions of regulation, recognising that there has been a shift to power operating across several spatial scales. Similarly, counter-mapping complicates state distribution of cartography, advocating bottom-up participatory mapping projects (see GIS and environmental governance). Counter-mapping initiatives, often without state assistance, attempt to exert power. As such, counter-mapping conforms to Jessop's notion of "governance without government". Another characteristic of governance is its "purposeful effort to steer, control or manage sectors or facets of society" towards a common goal. Likewise, as maps exude power and authority, they are a trusted medium with the ability to 'steer' society in a particular direction. In brief, cartography, once the tool of kings and governments, is now being used as a tool of governance - to advocate policy change from the grassroots. The environmental sphere is one context in which counter-mapping has been utilised as a governance tool.

=== Counter-mapping as environmental governance ===
In contrast to expert knowledges, lay knowledges are increasingly valuable to decision-makers, in part due to the scientific uncertainty surrounding environmental issues. Participatory counter-mapping projects are an effective means of incorporating lay knowledges into issues surrounding environmental governance. For instance, counter-maps depicting traditional use of areas now protected for biodiversity have been used to allow resource use, or to promote public debate about the issue, rather than forcing relocation. For example, the World Wide Fund for Nature used the results of counter-mapping to advocate for the reclassification of several strictly protected areas into Indonesian national parks, including Kayan Mentarang and Gunung Lorentz. The success of such counter-mapping efforts led Alcorn to affirm that governance (grassroots mapping projects), rather than government (top-down map distribution), offers the best hope for good natural resource management. In short, it can be seen that "maps are powerful political tools in ecological and governance discussions".

== Types of counter-mapping ==
Numerous counter-mapping types exist, for instance: protest maps, map art, counter-mapping for conservation, and PPGIS. In order to emphasise the wide scope of what has come to be known as counter-mapping, three contrasting counter-mapping examples are elucidated in this section: indigenous counter-mapping, community mapping, and state counter-mapping, respectively.

=== Indigenous counter-mapping ===
Counter-mapping has been undertaken predominantly in under-represented communities. Indigenous peoples are increasingly turning to participatory mapping, appropriating both the state's techniques and manner of representation. Counter-mapping is a tool for indigenous identity-building, and for bolstering the legitimacy of customary resource claims. The success of counter-mapping in realising indigenous claims can be seen through Nietschmann's assertion:

More indigenous territory has been claimed by maps than by guns. And more Indigenous territory can be reclaimed and defended by maps than by guns.

==== Creation of Nunavut ====
The power of indigenous counter-mapping can be exemplified through the creation of Nunavut. In 1967, Frank Arthur Calder and the Nisaga'a Nation Tribal Council brought an action against the Province of British Columbia for a declaration that aboriginal title to specified land had not been lawfully extinguished. In 1973, the Canadian Supreme Court found that there was, in fact, an aboriginal title. The Canadian government attempted to extinguish such titles by negotiating treaties with the people who had not signed them. As a first step, the Inuit Tapirisat of Canada studied Inuit land occupancy in the Arctic, resulting in the publication of the Inuit Land Use and Occupancy Project. Diverse interests, such as those of hunters, trappers, fishermen and berry-pickers mapped out the land they had used during their lives. As Usher noted:

We were no longer mapping the 'territories' of Aboriginal people based on the cumulative observations of others of where they were…but instead, mapping the Aboriginal peoples' own recollections of their own activities.

These maps played a fundamental role in the negotiations that enabled the Inuit to assert an aboriginal title to the 2 million km^{2} in Canada, today known as Nunavut. Counter-mapping is a tool by which indigenous groups can re-present the world in ways which destabilise dominant representations.

Indigenous peoples have begun remapping areas of the world that were once occupied by their ancestors as an act of reclamation of land stolen from them by country governments. Indigenous peoples have begun this process all over the world from the Indigenous peoples from the United States, Aboriginal peoples from Australia, and Amazonian people from Brazil. The people of the lands have begun creating their own maps of the land in terms of the borders of the territory and pathways around the territory. When Native peoples first began this process it was done by hand, but presently GPS systems and other technological mapping devices are used. Indigenous maps are reconceptualizing the "average" map and creatively representing space as well as the culture of those who live in the space. Indigenous people are creating maps that are for their power and social benefit instead of the ones forced on them through different titling, and description. Indigenous peoples are also creating maps to adjust to the contamination and pollution that is present In their land. Specifically in Peru, Indigenous peoples are using mapping to identify problem areas and innovating and creating strategies to combat these risks for the future.

===== Perspectives on the land (United States) =====
White colonists saw land as property and a commodity to be possessed. As a result, as settlers grew in numbers and journeyed west, land was claimed and sold for profit. White colonists would "develop" the land and take ownership of it with disregards to Indigenous peoples who, on the other hand, saw themselves as connected with the land spiritually and as bound to the land. Land to Aboriginal people is a major part of their identity and spirituality. They see the land as being sacred and needing to be protected, and believe it is their responsibility to take care of it. As Marion Kickett states in her research, "Land is very important to Aboriginal people with the common belief of 'we don't own the land, the land owns us'. Aboriginal people have always had a spiritual connection to their land..." These differing perspectives on land caused many disputes during the era of Manifest Destiny and as white settler populations began to increase and move into Indigenous peoples' territory and communities. The Indigenous people believed they were to serve the land while white colonists believed the land should serve them. As a result, when the two sides came in contact, they disputed over how to "claim" land. The height of this conflict occurred during Manifest Destiny as the white colonist population began this westward expansion.

===== The process of mapping (United States) =====
Maps represent and reflect how an individual or society names and projects themselves onto nature, literally and symbolically. Mapping, while objective, may be viewed politically as a method of control on territory. Mapmaking has thus both socio-cultural (myth-making) and technical (utilitarian and economic) functions and traditions. The differing boundaries and territories made by the White colonists and Indigenous people were vastly different, and expressed their views on the land and nature. Indigenous peoples' territory often ended at rivers, mountains, and hills or were defined by natural, geographical boundaries and/or relationships between different tribes, resources, and trade networks. The relationships between tribes would determine the access to the land and its resources. Unlike the rigid edges of the United States, borders on Indigenous peoples' lands were more fluid and would change based on marriages between chiefs and their family members, hunting clans, and heredity. In Indigenous maps the landmarks would be drawn on paper and in some cases described. Detailed knowledge of the thickness of ice, places of shelter and predators were placed in maps to inform the user for what to look for when in the territory.

Maps made by White colonists in America were first based on populations, and they created territories based on the edges of civilization. After the creation of the United States government, state land was designated by Congress and intended to be given equally by latitude and longitudinal coordinates. The ending of railroad tracks and crossings also designated the ending of one state to another, creating a fence-like boundary. In a special case, after the acquisition of the Louisiana Purchase, the United States had to decide between the territory where slavery was legal and where it was not. The Missouri Compromise was birthed as a result and a boundary line was created at the longitude and latitude lines of 36'30". The states were documented by their coordinates and borders were made at the numbered locations. These numbered locations would stretch for miles and encompass all in that territory even if it belonged to Indigenous peoples'. That is often how land would be stolen from Indigenous peoples. The land that would be "claimed" by the United States Government would stretch across Indigenous lands without consideration of their borders. Indigenous peoples' lands were absorbed by the borders of America's newly mapped states and were forced out as a result. Their livelihoods and mythology tied to the land was also destroyed. White colonists claimed the land for their own and Indigenous peoples were no longer allowed to occupy the space. Another way was the differences in the way each group mapped the land. The United States Government would not recognize a Tribes territory without a map and most tribes did not have maps that were in the style of European maps, therefore they were ignored.

=== Community mapping ===
Community mapping can be defined as "local mapping, produced collaboratively, by local people and often incorporating alternative local knowledge". OpenStreetMap is an example of a community mapping initiative, with the potential to counter the hegemony of state-dominated map distribution.

==== OpenStreetMap ====
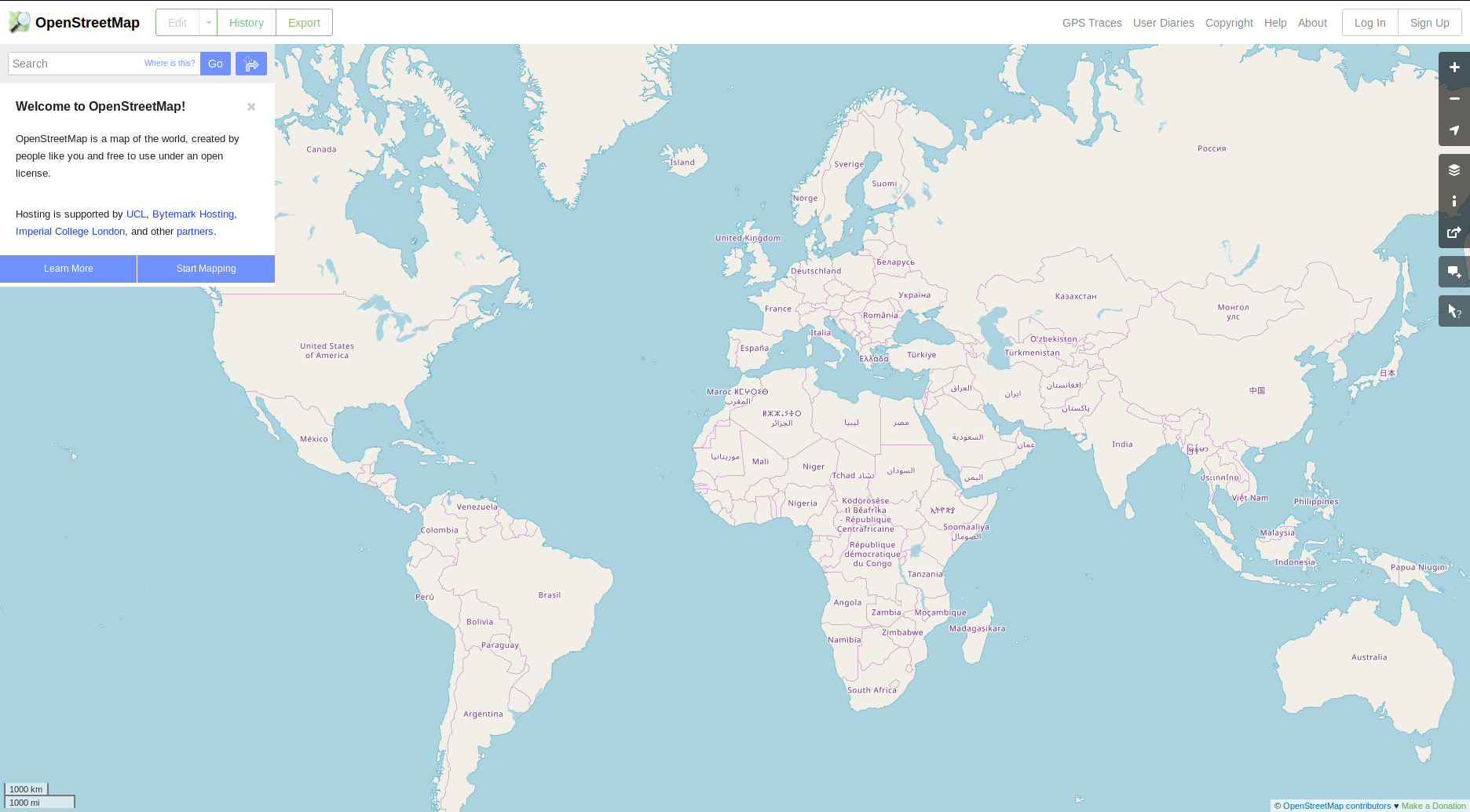
OpenStreetMap home page.

OpenStreetMap (OSM), a citizen-led spatial data collection website, was founded by Steve Coast in 2004. Data are collected from diverse public domain sources; of which GPS tracks are the most important, collected by volunteers with GPS receivers. As of 10 January 2011 there were 340,522 registered OSM users, who had uploaded 2.121 billion GPS points onto the website. The process of map creation explicitly relies upon sharing and participation; consequently, every registered OSM user can edit any part of the map. Moreover, 'map parties' – social events which aim to fill gaps in coverage – help foster a community ethos. In short, the grassroots OSM project can be seen to represent a paradigm shift in who creates and shares geographic information - from the state, to society. However, rather than countering the state-dominated cartographic project, some commentators have affirmed that OSM merely replicates the 'old' socio-economic order. For instance, Haklay affirmed that OSM users in the United Kingdom tend not to map council estates; consequently, middle-class areas are disproportionately mapped. Thus, in opposition to notions that OSM is a radical cartographic counter-culture, are contentions that OSM "simply recreates a mirror copy of existing topographic mapping".

=== State counter-mapping ===
What has come to be known as counter-mapping is not limited to the activities of non-state actors within a particular nation-state; relatively weak states also engage in counter-mapping in an attempt to challenge other states.

==== Competing cartographic representations ====
East Timor's ongoing effort to gain control of gas and oil resources from Australia, which it perceives at its own, is a form of counter-mapping. This dispute involves a cartographic contestation of Australia's mapping of the seabed resources between the two countries. As Nevins contends: whilst Australia's map is based on the status quo – a legacy of a 1989 agreement between Australia and the Indonesian occupier of East Timor at that time, East Timor's map represents an enlarged notion of what its sea boundaries should be, thereby entailing a redrawing of the map. This form of counter-mapping thus represents a claim by a relatively weak state, East Timor, to territory and resources that are controlled by a stronger state, Australia. However, Nevins notes that there is limited potential of realising a claim through East Timor's counter-map: counter-mapping is an effective strategy only when combined with broader legal and political strategies.

== Criticisms ==
Counter-mapping's claim to incorporate counter-knowledges, and thereby empower traditionally disempowered people, has not gone uncontested. A sample of criticisms leveled at counter-mapping:

- Counter-mapping fails to recognise that community is a constantly shifting, fluid process, too often relying on a notion of community as bounded and fixed. As such, the process of mapping communicates and naturalises who does, and who does not, belong within particular boundaries.
- Due to the power imbalance between indigenous claims and those of the state, the language and tools of the dominant society must be used by those under its control. The process of using another's tools can change the ideas represented, resulting in a map of unpredictable quality.
- Counter-mapping is in danger of becoming the 'thing to do'; a "magic bullet applied uncritically".
- There is a geography to the success of counter-mapping. In Tibet, counter-mapping is of limited political utility as mapmaking is not enfranchised and cannot be scaled up, for instance, to settle legal battles over land tenure and resource rights through the regulatory offices of the state.
- Counter-mapping projects utilising GIS require significant knowledge and computer literacy above that of lay individuals.
- Investment in specialised computers and software often results in prohibitive mapping costs for a large majority of local people, particularly in poor areas. As some groups prove more capable of adopting the technologies than others, counter-mapping projects can deepen divisions within communities along gender and economic lines.

To summarise, whilst counter-mapping has the potential to transform map-making from "a science of princes", the investment required to create a map with the ability to challenge state-produced cartography means that counter-mapping is unlikely to become a "science of the masses".

== See also ==
- GIS and environmental governance
- Deep map
