= Wikimapia =

Russian geographic online encyclopedia

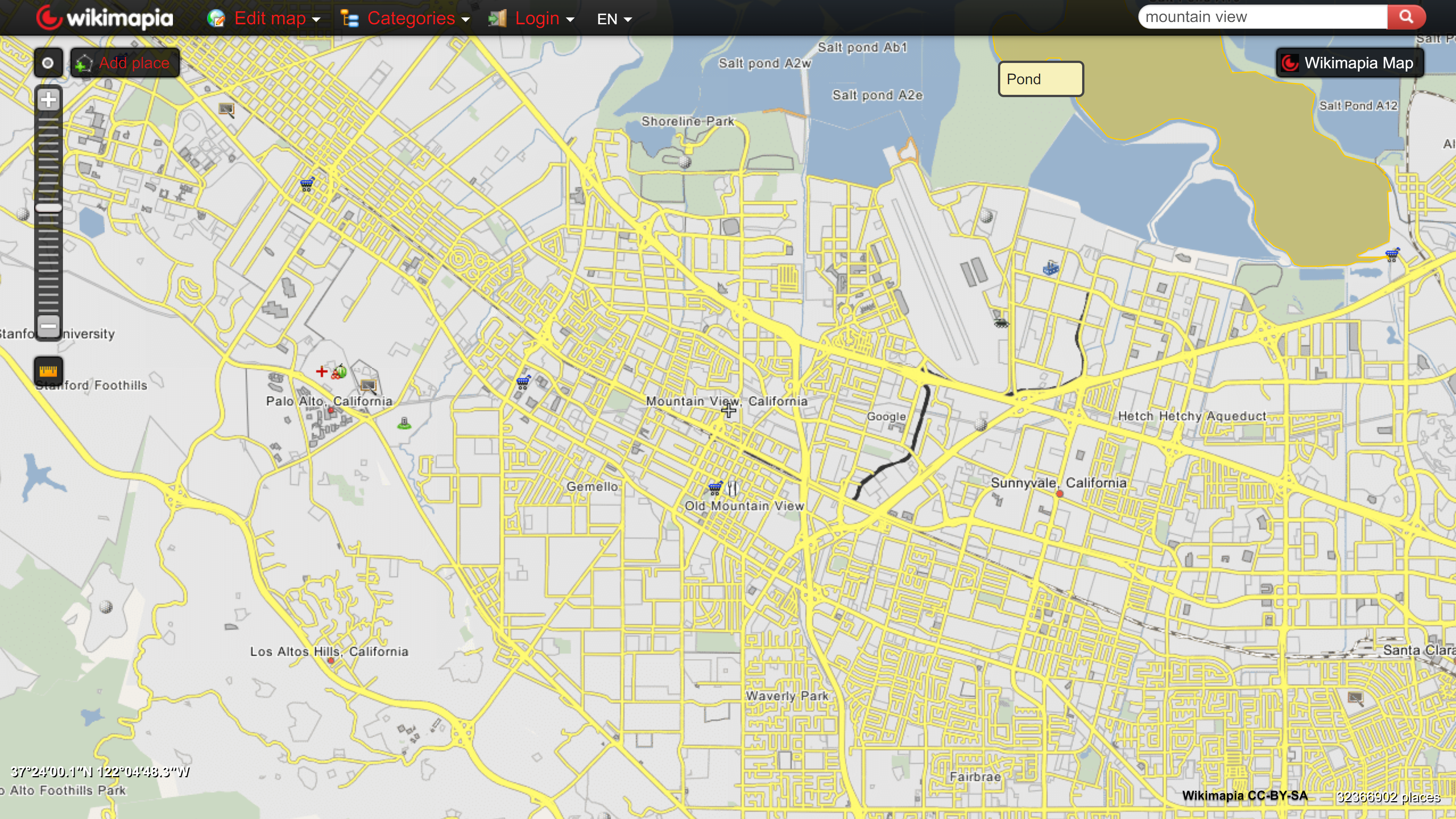
- Website type: Geographic online encyclopedia
- Available in: 101 languages, including English
- Country of origin: Russia
- Creators: Alexander Koryakin and Evgeniy Saveliev
- Revenue: From AdSense and Wikimapia Ads
- Website: wikimapia.org
- Commercial: yes
- Registration: Optional
- Users: 2,500,000 (latest available figure)
- Launched: 24 May 2006; 20 years ago
- Current status: Active
- Content license: Creative Commons (CC BY-SA)

Wikimapia (stylized as wikimapia) is a Russian geographic online encyclopedia project. The project implements an interactive clickable web map that utilizes Google Maps with a geographically referenced wiki system, with the aim to mark and describe all geographical objects in the world.

== History ==
Wikimapia was created in Russia by Alexandre Koriakine and Evgeniy Saveliev in May 2006. The data, a crowdsourced collection of places marked by registered users and guests, has grown to over 32,000,000 objects as of May 2026 and is released under the Creative Commons License Attribution-ShareAlike (CC BY-SA). Although the project's name is reminiscent of that of Wikipedia, and the creators share parts of the "wiki" philosophy, it is not a part of the non-profit Wikimedia Foundation family of wikis. Since 2018, following years of declining popularity, the site has gone nearly inactive with the site's owners having been unable to pay for the usage of Google Maps and the site's social media accounts having remained derelict. A study from 2017 remarked that the site's popularity was in a steady decline since 2012.

After the 2022 Russian invasion of Ukraine, the page was closed on 2 March 2022. As of 13 March 2022 access to the site was met with the following message: "Wikimapia is turned off for some time (days or even weeks). The site is under cyber attack all these days. Stay tuned. Explanation later." Their Facebook page indicated they were hit by one or possibly several DNS attacks after a request was made to remove Ukrainian military installation listings, which was not immediately honored. However, an older version of Wikimapia was still accessible despite the page being closed. After two weeks, the page went back and reopened on 25 March 2022.

== Main principles ==
According to the website, Wikimapia is an open-content collaborative mapping project, aimed at marking all geographical objects in the world and providing a useful description of them. It aims to create and maintain a free, complete, multilingual and up-to-date map of the whole world. Wikimapia intends to contain detailed information about every place on Earth.

== Features ==
=== Viewing ===
The Wikimapia website provides a Google Maps API-based interactive web map that consists of user-generated information layered on top of Google Maps satellite imagery and other resources. The navigation interface provides scroll and zoom functionality similar to that of Google Maps.

The Wikimapia layer is a collection of "objects" with a polygonal outline (like buildings, forests, or lakes) and "linear features" (streets, railroads, rivers, ferry). Streets are connected by intersection points to form a street grid. Both kinds of items may have textual descriptions and photos attached to them. Viewers are able to click on any marked object or street segment to see its description. Descriptions can be searched by a built-in search tool. Tools for refining existing places according to category as well as measuring distances between objects are also available. Objects marked as buildings can have internal places (such as a business inside a larger office building) added.

Categories are organized in a hierarchy such that viewing by a more general category includes having the specific category included. This is such as viewing "house" includes viewing "detached house". The hierarchy is not a strict hierarchy. For instance, the category "convenience store" appears in multiple places in the hierarchy.

The interface is available in many languages, and the textual description of each item may have multiple versions in different languages. Wikimapia maps can also be embedded on other websites.

=== Map editing ===
The data in Wikimapia is derived from voluntary crowdsourcing. All users, registered or unregistered (guests), are allowed to add a place on the Wikimapia layer, but guests cannot edit places created by registered users, and have some other limitations. Using a simple graphical editing tool, users are able to draw an outline or polygon that matches the satellite image layer underneath. Each object or "tag" has specific information fields which include categories, a textual description, street address, and a related Wikipedia link. Users are likewise capable of uploading several relevant photos.

Registered users have fewer restrictions on map editing, and are able to edit and/or delete existing places as well as draw "linear features" (roads, railroads, rivers, and ferry lines). A "watchlist" could be manually set up to monitor all activity or object changes made in one or more of the assigned rectangular areas on the map.

== Administration ==
The website is maintained and developed by a small team of administrators (the Wikimapia Team), who introduce new features and determine further evolution course. Improvements are largely based on a feedback system from registered users through public forum discussions, bug reports and feature requests.

=== User levels and special roles ===
The registered user community is largely self-organized, with users communicating through an internal message system and through a public forum. Map editing rewards the user "experience points" and milestone "awards" assigned by the system.

Registered users are automatically ranked in levels according to accumulated experience points, with higher levels gaining access to advanced tools and having fewer restrictions on editing activity. A registered user may be promoted to "Advanced User" (AU) status as other existing AUs deem it fit. Additional editing and moderation tools, which include the authority to ban users, are given to an Advanced User, who is given the responsibility of countering vandalism in the map.

Special roles of maintaining the website forum, place categories, and the Wikimapia Documentation (Docs) are also given by the Wikimapia Team to some users.

== Quality of contents ==
The data in Wikimapia is derived from voluntary contributors who visit and add information to the website. The textual description attached to each place object is in free format, having no restriction on style, except for possessing a neutral point of view, where "neutral" is defined as excluding "feelings, opinions, experiences, words which display a personal bias or agenda, politics and/or religion". Citing the source of the information is optional, and a link to a relevant and existing Wikipedia article is encouraged.

In spite of these recommendations, map coverage is generally uneven, with some areas, usually in developing countries, being cluttered with crude outlines, private residences, subjective evaluations or advertisements, requiring constant attention and refining by regular editors. Information can either be edited or deleted by registered users as they deem it inappropriate.

== Licensing ==
In December 2009, Wikimapia launched an API and made its content available in several formats for non-commercial use. In December 2010, the data was announced as being available under a Non-Commercial Creative Commons license.

In May 2012, Wikimapia announced that all the content was available under Creative Commons License Attribution-ShareAlike (CC BY-SA).

== Business model ==
The site generates some income from AdSense and Wikimapia Ads.

== Interoperability ==
Wikimapia functionality is available on:

- Google Earth, using Google Earth dynamic layer in KML file.
- Embedded in any HTML page.
- Most Java-enabled cellphones using 3rd party software such as Mobile GMaps.
- iOS (iPhone/iPad) application.
- Android application.

== See also ==
- Bhuvan
- Collaborative mapping
- Google Earth
- Google Map Maker
- HERE Map Creator
- List of GPS Software for Mobile Phones
- List of wikis
- OpenStreetMap
- Participatory GIS
- Yandex Maps
