= Traditional knowledge GIS =

Traditional knowledge Geographic Information Systems (GIS) is a toolset of systems designed to document and utilize traditional knowledge from communities around the world. Traditional knowledge GIS differ from ordinary cognitive maps in that they express environmental and spiritual relationships among real and conceptual entities. This toolset focuses on cultural preservation, land rights disputes, natural resource management, and economic development.

Traditional knowledge GIS analyze the nature of political and social struggles that lead to competing resource claims. They are powerful tools for mediation and negotiation among coexisting social groups.

== Technical aspects ==
Traditional knowledge GIS employs cartographic and database management techniques such as participatory GIS, map biographies, and historical mapping.

Participatory GIS encourages public involvement in all aspects of a GIS, and is widely accepted as necessary for sound environmental and economic planning in developing areas. This method incorporates sacred sites and traditional land use practices into scientific analysis. Participatory GIS can be effective for local resource management and planning, but researchers doubt its efficacy as a tool in attaining land tenure or fighting legal battles because of lack of expertise among local individuals and lack of access to technology.

Map biographies track the practices of local communities either for the sake of preservation or to argue for resource protection or land grants. This also allows for the recording and playing of oral histories and representations of abstract ecological knowledge.

Historical mapping analyzes and documents events that are meaningful to a particular tradition or locale. Cultural and humanitarian benefits can be derived from including maps in the historical record of an area.

== Cultural preservation ==
As adherents to traditional lifestyles decline in population, a degree of urgency has developed around the collection of data and wisdom from aging local elders. A central feature of cultural preservation is language revitalization. Bilingual visual and auditory maps depict oral traditions and historical information in places of cultural significance at various scales and levels of detail.

Researchers encounter significant obstacles to data acquisition due to the sensitive nature of much of the data sought for a traditional knowledge GIS, and locals may distrust the motives of outside consultants.

== Land rights and natural resource management ==
Traditional knowledge GIS can influence debates over land rights and resource management in ecologically sensitive areas. The interests of local residents in these regions often conflict with those of migrant workers, state conservation units, and domestic and foreign mining or logging enterprises. GIS hardware and software are used to identify spatial trends in interpreting these conflicts.

== Economic development ==
Economic development through traditional knowledge GIS is subject to local ownership over the systems and full access to relevant data and training. This situation is rare outside of industrialized nations, so little progress has been made in this field of research.

== Current issues and effectiveness ==
There is a disparate nature to implementations of traditional knowledge GIS across geographies. Though developing nations utilize some forms of participatory GIS, their communities are less likely to gain access to expensive databases and cartographic methods compared to those in developed nations.

The overall effectiveness of traditional knowledge GIS has not been conclusively determined. Those who advocate for traditional mapping cite successes in acquiring land titles, managing local databases, and creating new skill sets for local communities worldwide. However, detractors cite cost, the need for specialized training, and cultural differences as reasons GIS may be inappropriate for these applications.

== Software ==
=== No cost or open-source software ===
The Nunaliit Atlas Framework was developed by and is maintained by the Geomatics and Cartographic Research Centre at Carleton University. The focus of this software is to create community atlas projects.

=== Commercial software ===
The CEDAR tool has a number of modules focused on contact relationship management, consultation for development projects, heritage projects and GIS.

The LOUIS toolkit is a suite of tools for recording, managing and using traditional land use and traditional knowledge information.

== See also ==
- Participatory 3D modelling (P3DM)
- Participatory GIS
