= Denis Wood =

American artist (born 1945)

Denis Wood (born 1945) is an American artist, author, cartographer, and a former professor of Design at North Carolina State University. Wood grew up in Cleveland, Ohio, receiving a BA in English (in 1967) from then Western Reserve University (now Case Western Reserve University). He received an MA (in 1971) and a PhD (in 1973) in geography from Clark University, in Worcester, Massachusetts. Wood taught environmental psychology, landscape history, and design in then School of Design (now College of Design) at North Carolina State University from 1974 through 1996, living and raising his family in Boylan Heights. Beginning in 1996, Wood spent over two years in prison on a conviction for molesting a teenage boy.

== Academic career ==
His book The Power of Maps (1992) was considered radical when it was published. The Power of Maps has been a linchpin of the “new cartographies” in which maps are redefined as socially constructed arguments based upon consistent semiotic codes.

Wood's consistent critique “of the ideals of modern academic cartographers and of modern cartographic ideology” has been wide-ranging, informed, and decisive. In 2004, John Pickles, Early N. Phillips Distinguished professor at the University of North Carolina summed up Wood's contributions this way: “For over twenty-five years, Denis Wood has been provoking us to think differently and critically about maps and map use.” The book was first issued in 1992 as a catalogue accompanying a major exhibition called The Power of Maps at the Cooper-Hewitt National Museum of Design in New York. That show was later remounted at the Smithsonian Institution in Washington in 1994. These exhibitions were the graphic genesis of the 1992 book which has been the subject of both scholarly commentary and popular interest.

As opposed to those who insist maps “represent” reality the critical cartographers, led by Wood, have insisted maps represent nothing. Instead, they present an argument about the world through the careful choice of content arranged graphically at a specific scale. This thesis, and the mechanisms of its activation, is at the heart of Wood and John Fels 2008 University of Chicago Press publication, The Natures of Maps. As one reviewer put it: “In 1986 Wood and Fels took apart the map; describing ten codes through which its signs create meaning. Their argument was subsequently enfolded into Wood’s The Power of Maps …Twenty-one years later, Wood and Fels have put the map back together again ‘by replacing the whole idea of the map as a representation with that of the map as a system of propositions.’” “The map is not a picture,” Wood and Fels insist in this new book, “It is an argument … everything about a map, from top to bottom, is an argument.”

This idea of the map as an argument presented rather than a reality represented extends a more general thesis on the manner in which we “construct” the world through a range of socially-conditioned perspectives, and do so at various scales. A relevant but quite distinct title in this area of work is Wood's 2004 volume, Five Billion Years of Global Change: A History of the Land.

== Cartographic art ==
More recently, Wood has joined his expertise in cartography with his interest in art and art history. A collage artist and painter, he has created in recent years a bibliography and history of cartographic art; work that from the Dadaist to the present have used maps as a medium for the exposition of cultural and political ideas and ideals. Again, the general thesis is the same as in Wood's other work: images—whether map, art, or artful maps—present a thesis through selection of subject matter self-consciously arranged through a medium's tools of exposition.

== Conviction ==
In April 1996, Wood pleaded guilty to "crimes against nature" (viz. fellatio) and "taking indecent liberties with a minor", on more than one-hundred and thirty occasions. From 1996 to 1998, he spent 26 months in the North Carolina penal system as a result of his conviction. He is not on any national or regional register of sex offenders and has spoken publicly about his incarceration and the charges that led to it.

The urbanist writer and activist Jane Jacobs has wondered in press whether Wood's arrest and incarceration may be one reason why some of his work receives less attention than it deserves. Despite the conviction, his writing and work continued and since his release he has continued to live in Raleigh, NC, while lecturing and working internationally in his field. For example, in 2008 he presented a plenary at the Royal Geographical Society in London.

In a 1998 interview with the News and Observer, Wood announced plans for a book based on his prison experience. It was described as planned for publication by the Johns Hopkins University Press. The book is currently scheduled for publication by The Center for American Places, distributed by University of Chicago Press. Wood offered a presentation with the same title at the 2003 annual meeting of the American Public Health Association.

== Publications ==
Wood has published several scholarly articles and books. His books include:

- The Power of Maps with John Fels - 1992
- Home Rules with Robert J. Beck - 1994, Johns Hopkins University Press, ISBN 0801846188
- Seeing through Maps with Ward Kaiser - 2001, and a second edition in 2006
- Five Billion Years of Change: A History of the Land - 2004
- Making Maps with John Krygier - 2005
- The Natures of Maps with John Fels -2008
- Rethinking the Power of Maps with John Fels and John Krygier -2010
- Everything Sings: Maps for a Narrative Atlas with Ira Glass (Introduction), Siglio, 2011. ISBN 978-0-9799562-4-9
