= Participatory GIS =

Approach to spacial planning, information, and communications management

Participatory GIS (PGIS) or public participation geographic information system (PPGIS) is a participatory approach to spatial planning and spatial information and communications management.

PGIS combines Participatory Learning and Action (PLA) methods with geographic information systems (GIS). PGIS combines a range of geo-spatial information management tools and methods such as sketch maps, participatory 3D modelling (P3DM), aerial photography, satellite imagery, and global positioning system (GPS) data to represent peoples' spatial knowledge in the forms of (virtual or physical) two- or three-dimensional maps used as interactive vehicles for spatial learning, discussion, information exchange, analysis, decision making and advocacy. Participatory GIS implies making geographic technologies available to disadvantaged groups in society in order to enhance their capacity in generating, managing, analysing and communicating spatial information.

If appropriately utilized, the practice could exert profound impacts on community empowerment, innovation and social change. More importantly, by placing control of access and use of culturally sensitive spatial information in the hands of those who generated them, PGIS practice could protect traditional knowledge and wisdom from external exploitation.

PPGIS is meant to bring the academic practices of GIS and mapping to the local level in order to promote knowledge production by local and non-governmental groups. The idea behind PPGIS is empowerment and inclusion of marginalized populations, who have little voice in the public arena, through geographic technology education and participation. PPGIS uses and produces digital maps, satellite imagery, sketch maps, and multiple other spatial and visual tools, to change geographic involvement and awareness on a local level. The term was coined in 1996 at the meetings of the National Center for Geographic Information and Analysis (NCGIA).

== Debate ==
Attendees to the Mapping for Change International Conference on Participatory Spatial Information Management and Communication concurred to at least three potential implications of PPGIS. It can: (1) enhance capacity in generating, managing, and communicating spatial information; (2) stimulate innovation; and ultimately (3) encourage positive social change. This reflects on the rather nebulous definition of PPGIS as referenced in the Encyclopedia of GIS which describes PPGIS as having a definition problem.

There are a range of applications for PPGIS. The potential outcomes can be applied from community and neighborhood planning and development to environmental and natural resource management. Marginalized groups, be they grassroots organizations to indigenous populations could benefit from GIS technology.

Governments, non-government organizations and non-profit groups are a big force behind multiple programs. The current extent of PPGIS programs in the US has been evaluated by Sawicki and Peterman. They catalog over 60 PPGIS programs that aid in "public participation in community decision making by providing local-area data to community groups," in the United States. The organizations providing these programs are mostly universities, local chambers of commerce, non-profit foundations.

In general, neighborhood empowerment groups can form and gain access to information that is normally easy for the official government and planning offices to obtain. It is easier for this to happen than for individuals of lower-income neighborhoods just working by themselves. There have been several projects where university students help implement GIS in neighborhoods and communities. It is believed that access to information is the doorway to more effective government for everybody and community empowerment. In a case study of a group in Milwaukee, residents of an inner city neighborhood became active participants in building a community information system, learning to access public information and create and analyze new databases derived from their own surveys, all with the purpose of making these residents useful actors in city management and in the formation of public policy. In a number of cases, there are providers of data for community groups, but the groups may not know that such entities exist. Getting the word out would be beneficial.

Some of the spatial data that the neighborhood wanted was information on abandoned or boarded-up buildings and homes, vacant lots, and properties that contained garbage, rubbish and debris that contributed to health and safety issues in the area. They also appreciated being able to find landlords that were not keeping up the properties. The university team and the community were able to build databases and make maps that would help them find these areas and perform the spatial analysis that they needed. Community members learned how to use the computer resources, ArcView 1.0, and build a theme or land use map of the surrounding area. They were able to perform spatial queries and analyze neighborhood problems. Some of these problems included finding absentee landlords and finding code violations for the buildings on the maps.

== Approaches ==
There are two approaches to PPGIS use and application. These two perspectives, top–down and bottom–up, are the currently debated schism in PPGIS.

=== Top-down ===
According to Sieber (2006), PPGIS was first envisioned as a means of mapping individuals by multiple social and economic demographic factors in order to analyze the spatial differences in access to social services. She refers to this kind of PPGIS as top-down, being that it is less hands on for the public, but theoretically serves the public by making adjustments for the deficiencies, and improvements in public management.

=== Bottom-up ===
A current trend with academic involvement in PPGIS, is researching existing programs, and or starting programs in order to collect data on the effectiveness of PPGIS. Elwood (2006) in The Professional Geographer, talks in depth about the "everyday inclusions, exclusions, and contradictions of Participatory GIS research." The research is being conducted in order to evaluate if PPGIS is involving the public equally. In reference to Sieber's top-down PPGIS, this is a counter method of PPGIS, rightly referred to as bottom-up PPGIS. Its purpose is to work with the public to let them learn the technologies, then producing their own GIS.

Public participation GIS is defined by Sieber as the use of geographic information systems to broaden public involvement in policymaking as well as the value of GIS to promote the goals of nongovernmental organizations, grassroots groups and community-based organizations. It would seem on the surface that PPGIS, as it is commonly referred to, in this sense would be of a beneficial nature to those in the community or area that is being represented. But in truth only certain groups or individuals will be able to obtain the technology and use it. Is PPGIS becoming more available to the underprivileged sector of the community? The question of "who benefits?" should always be asked, and does this harm a community or group of individuals.

The local, participatory management of urban neighborhoods usually follows on from 'claiming the territory', and has to be made compatible with national or local authority regulations on administering, managing and planning urban territory. PPGIS applied to participatory community/neighborhood planning has been examined by many others. Specific attention has been given to applications such as housing issues or neighborhood revitalization. Spatial databases along with the P-mapping are used to maintain a public records GIS or community land information systems. These are just a few of the uses of GIS in the community.

==== Examples ====
Public Participation in decision making processes works not only to identify areas of common values or variability, but also as an illustrative and instructional tool. One example of effective dialogue and building trust between the community and decision makers comes from pre-planning for development in the United Kingdom. It involves using GIS and multi-criteria decision analysis (MCDA) to make a decision about wind farm siting. This method hinges upon taking all stakeholder perspectives into account to improve chances of reaching consensus . This also creates a more transparent process and adds weight to the final decision by building upon traditional methods such as public meetings and hearings, surveys, focus groups, and deliberative processes enabling participants more insights and more informed opinions on environmental issues.

Collaborative processes that consider objective and subjective inputs have the potential to efficiently address some of the conflict between development and nature as they involve a fuller justification by wind farm developers for location, scale, and design. Spatial tools such as creation of 3D view sheds offer participants new ways of assessing visual intrusion to make a more informed decision. Higgs et al. make a telling statement when analyzing the success of this project – "the only way of accommodating people's landscape concerns is to site wind farms in places that people find more acceptable". This implies that developers recognize the validity of citizens' concerns and are willing to compromise in identifying sites where wind farms will not only be successful financially, but also successful politically and socially. This creates greater accountability and facilitates the incorporation of stakeholder values to resolve differences and gain public acceptance for vital development projects.

In another planning example, Simao et al. analyzed how to create sustainable development options with widespread community support. They determined that stakeholders need to learn likely outcomes that result from stated preferences, which can be supported through enhanced access to information and incentives to increase public participation. Through a multi-criteria spatial decision support system stakeholders were able to voice concerns and work on a compromise solution to have final outcome accepted by majority when siting wind farms. This differs from the work of Higgs et al. in that the focus was on allowing users to learn from the collaborative process, both interactively and iteratively about the nature of the problem and their own preferences for desirable characteristics of solution.

This stimulated sharing of opinions and discussion of interests behind preferences. After understanding the problem more fully, participants could discuss alternative solutions and interact with other participants to come to a compromise solution. Similar work has been done to incorporate public participation in spatial planning for transportation system development, and this method of two-way benefits is even beginning to move towards web-based mapping services to further simplify and extend the process into the community.

== See also ==
- Collaborative mapping
- Counter-mapping
- Geodesign
- Geographic information system
- Neogeography
- OpenStreetMap
- Public participation
- Traditional knowledge GIS
- Volunteered geographic information
- Web mapping

== Other Sources ==
- Public Participation and GIS: Annotated Bibliography
- Community Mapping, PGIS, PPGIS and P3DM Virtual Library
