= Participatory 3D modelling =

Community-based mapping method

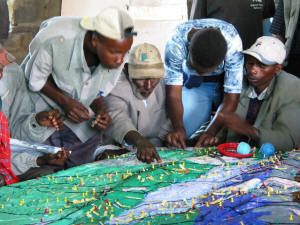
Ogiek Peoples visualising their traditional spatial knowledge on a 1:10,000 scale participatory 3D model, Nessuit, Mau Forest Complex, Kenya

Participatory 3D modelling (P3DM) is a community-based mapping method which integrates local spatial knowledge with data on elevation of the land and depth of the sea to produce stand-alone, scaled and geo-referenced relief models. Essentially based on local spatial knowledge, land use and cover, and other features are depicted by informants on the model by the use of pushpins (points), yarns (lines) and paints (polygons). On completion, a scaled and geo-referenced grid is applied to facilitate data extraction or importation. Data depicted on the model are extracted, digitised and plotted. On completion of the exercise the model remains with the community.

== Awards ==
On November 5, 2007 at a ceremony which took place during the Global Forum 2007 at the Fondazione Giorgio Cini in Venice, Italy, the CTA-supported project Participatory 3D Modelling (P3DM) for Resource Use, Development Planning and Safeguarding Intangible Cultural Heritage in Fiji was granted the World Summit Award 2007 in the category e-culture. The product, based on the use of P3DM, has been considered as one of the 40 best practice examples of quality e-Content in the world . The product has been delivered by the following organizations: Fiji Locally-Managed Marine Area (FLMMA) Network, WWF South Pacific Programme, Native Lands Trust Board, Secretariat of the Pacific Community, National Trust of Fiji, Lomaiviti Provincial Council and the Technical Centre for Agricultural and Rural Cooperation ACP-EU (CTA).

== See also ==
- Geographic information system (GIS)
- Neogeography
- Participatory GIS (PGIS) or public participation geographic information system (PPGIS)
- Raised-relief map
- Traditional knowledge GIS
