= Macroscope (science concept) =

Science concept

In science, the concept of a macroscope is the antithesis of the microscope, namely a method, technique or system appropriate to the study of very large objects or very complex processes, for example the Earth and its contents, or conceptually, the Universe. Obviously, a single system or instrument does not presently exist that could fulfil this function, however its concept may be approached by some current or future combination of existing observational systems. The term "macroscope" has also been applied to a method or compendium which can view some more specific aspect of global scientific phenomena in its entirety, such as all plant life, specific ecological processes, or all life on earth. The term has also been used in the humanities, as a generic label for tools which permit an overview of various other forms of "big data". As discussed here, the concept of a "macroscope" differs in essence from that of the macroscopic scale, which simply takes over from where the microscopic scale leaves off, covering all objects large enough to be visible to the unaided eye, as well as from macro photography, which is the imaging of specimens at magnifications greater than their original size, and for which a specialised microscope-related instrument known as a "Macroscope" has previously been marketed. For some workers, one or more (planetary scale) "macroscopes" can already be constructed, to access the sum of relevant existing observations, while for others, deficiencies in current sampling regimes and/or data availability point to additional sampling effort and deployment of new methodologies being required before a true "macroscope" view of Earth can be obtained.

== History of the concept ==
The term "macroscope" is generally credited as being introduced into scientific usage by the ecologist Howard T. Odum in 1971, who employed it, in contrast to the microscope (which shows small objects in great detail), to represent a kind of "detail eliminator" which thus permits a better overview of ecological systems for simplified modelling and, potentially, management (Odum, 1971, figure 10). Ecologist James Brown equated the field of Macroecology as the process of looking "at the living world through a macroscope rather than through a microscope, and as a result it sees different things than are revealed by most ecological studies ... As I began to look through the macroscope, however, I found that it gave me a view of the ecological world that neither my experiments at one study site nor my nonmanipulative comparative studies at a necessarily limited number of field sites could provide."

Some authors, such as Hidefumi Imura, continue to use the term as more-or-less synonymous with an overview or large scale pattern analysis of data in their field. Other prominent authors and speakers who have utilized "macroscope" terminology for "big picture" views in their particular areas of interest include Jesse H. Ausubel and John Thackara.

In actuality, the term (in the present sense of a "larger view" of a subject than can be obtained by any single conventional action) pre-dates its use in Odum's work, being found for example in a book by Philip Bagby entitled "Culture and History: Prolegomena to the Comparative Study of Civilizations" published in 1959, who wrote, "[Someone should] invent a 'macroscope', an instrument which would ensure that the historian sees only the larger aspects of history and blind him to the individual details", and also by W.H. Hargreaves and K.H. Blacker, who wrote in 1966 in the journal Psychiatric Services: "The advent of the electronic digital computer is causing a revolution in the behavioral sciences comparable to the impact the microscope had on biology. Like the microscope, the computer provides a view that is beyond the capability of the naked eye. The computer is being used as a "macroscope," which enables us to perceive relationships based on larger patterns of information than we are otherwise able to integrate." Slightly earlier still, in the area of geography, in a 1957 article entitled "Geographer's Quest" for the Centennial Review of Arts & Science, Lawrence M. Sommers and Clarence L. Vinge wrote: "What do we see? What are the inter-relationships that exist among the observed features? The near-views can, by means of mapping, be resolved with over-the-horizon views, and the map becomes a "macroscope" to help us understand the spatial organization of the Earth's phenomena.", while in a 1951 United States Department of Agriculture Appropriation Bill, discussing a recently passed Forestry Management Act, Perry H. Merrill, State Forester of Vermont, is reported as saying: "Through [this Act] I feel that we have made a great headway ... instead of looking through a microscope, maybe we can look through a "macroscope", if you want to call it such." (Note: The term may in fact be considerably older: in a letter in the 1895(!) issue of "Forest and Stream" by a correspondent under the pseudonym "Ego", the following intriguing text occurs: "The microscope has opened up the world of little things as the macroscope has opened up the world of great things, and, though both go an infinite distance beyond the scope of man's vision, instead of bringing him nearer the end, they but immensely enlarge the beginning." Another, even earlier, use of the term occurs in Ludimar Hermann's 1875 book "Elements of Human Physiology", where, in a discussion of optics and optical instruments, he writes: "Two fine threads or lines, which are at a constant distance from the eye are approximated to one another... Instead of approximating the objects to one another, they can also be looked at with the aid of an apparatus for diminishing the size of objects (macroscope).")

The term was (re-)presented as new (Odum's prior use was mentioned in a footnote) by the French scientific thinker Joël de Rosnay, who wrote a detailed book explaining his concept in 1975: "We need, then, a new instrument. The microscope and the telescope have been valuable in gathering the scientific knowledge of the universe. Now a new tool is needed by all those who would try to understand and direct effectively their action in this world, whether they are responsible for major decisions in politics, in science, and in industry or are ordinary people as we are. I shall call this instrument the macroscope (from macro, great, and skopein, to observe)." In de Rosnay's view, the macroscope could be turned not only on the natural and physical worlds but also on human-related systems such as the growth of cities, economics, and the behaviour of humans in society.

More recent workers have tended to use the term synonymously with a whole-of-Earth observational system, or portion thereof, underpinned particularly by satellite imagery derived from remote sensing, and/or by in situ observations obtained via sensor networks (see below).

As an extension of its science context, the term "macroscope" has also been applied in the humanities, as a generic term for any tool permitting an overview of, and insight into "big data" collections in that or related areas. For completeness, it should be mentioned that the concept of a "reverse microscope" is not entirely new: around 80 years earlier, the author Lewis Carroll in the second volume of his novel Sylvie and Bruno, published in 1893, described a fictional professor who includes in his lecture an instrument that will shrink an elephant to the size of a mouse, that he termed the "megaloscope". The Dutch author Kees Boeke also wrote a 1957 book, Cosmic View: The Universe in 40 Jumps, the first portion of which presents images of aspects of the Earth at ever decreasing scales and parallels the subsequent principle of the hypothetical "macroscope" at a series of zoom levels.

== Interpretation and practical implementations ==
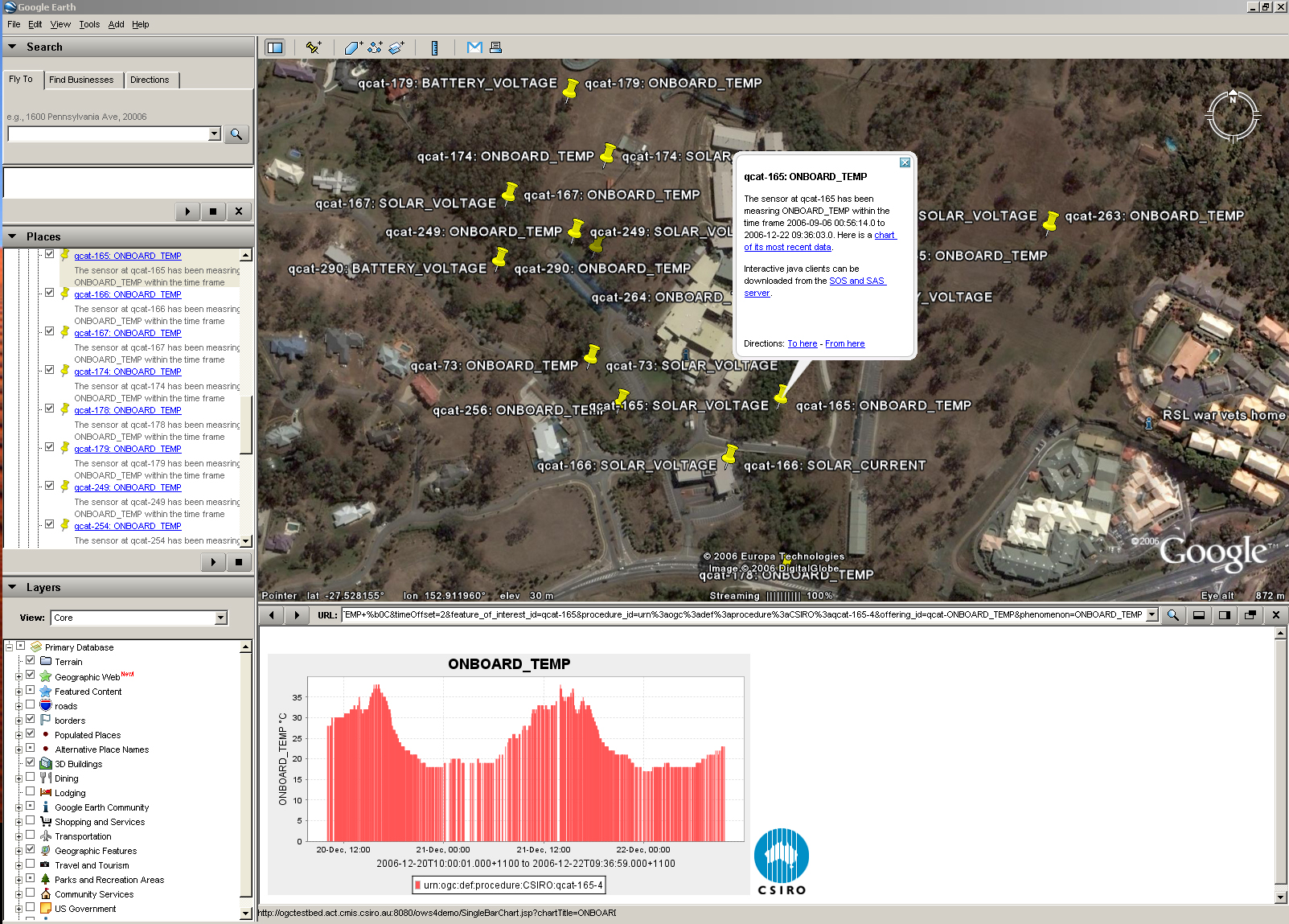
Image from a 2007 "macroscope" demonstration concept from the ICT Division of CSIRO, showing physical data from a Fleck wireless sensor network overlaid on Google topographic imagery

The more practical aspect of exactly what constitutes a macroscope has varied through time and according to the interests, requirements, and field of activity of the workers concerned. Sommers and Vinge viewed the "macroscope" as an extended system of mapping to visualize the spatial relationships between items on the surface of the Earth, thus notionally prefiguring the concept of subsequently developed "seamless" geographic display systems via CD-ROMs and the world wide web along the lines of the "Atlas" facility of Microsoft Encarta, and Google Maps/Google Earth. Odum's concept was for the study of ecosystems, by integrating the results of existing methods of surveying, identifying, and classifying their contents, then eliminating fine scale detail to obtain a "big picture" view suitable for analysis and, as needed, simulation. De Rosnay viewed his "macroscope" as a systems-based viewpoint for the study of (among other things) the nature of human society, and understanding of the rationale for human actions. He wrote:

Let us use the macroscope to direct a new look at nature, society, and man and to try to identify new rules of education and action. In its field of vision organizations, events, and evolutions are illuminated by a totally different light. The macroscope filters details and amplifies that which links things together. It is not used to make things larger or smaller but to observe what is at once too great, too slow, and too complex for our eyes (human society, for example, is a gigantic organism that is totally invisible to us).

From around the early 2000s onwards, interest in the "macroscope" concept has steadily increased, both with the vastly improved computing power in organisations and on scientists' desktops, and with access to more extensive sets of both locally acquired and publicly available data such as Earth observations. For some recent workers such as Dornelas et al. as referenced below, the macroscope is the envisaged set of the observational tools that collectively will deliver the desired synoptic suite of observations over the relevant field of study (in their case for the marine realm, itemised as satellites, drones, camera traps, passive acoustic samplers, biologgers, environmental DNA and human observations), Writing in 2019, these authors stated:

Earth-based observations of the biosphere are spatially biased in ways that can limit our ability to detect macroecological patterns and changes in biodiversity. To resolve this problem, we need to supplement the ad hoc data currently collected with planned biodiversity monitoring, in order to approximate global stratified random sampling of the planet. We call this all-encompassing observational system 'the macroscope'. ... By deploying a nested array of these tools [satellites, drones, camera traps, etc.] that fills current gaps in monitoring, we can achieve a macroscope fit for purpose and turn these existing powerful tools into more than the sum of their parts.

For others, the macroscope is already here, as a sort of "virtual instrument", with data sources such as Landsat satellite imagery providing the requisite high resolution Earth view, and/or wireless sensor networks providing a suite of local, in situ observations. In the view of IBM researchers, the macroscope is the technical solution—basically within the realms of data management, data analysis and data mining—that will permit all existing earth and related observations to be integrated and queried for meaningful results. Writing in 2017 they stated:

By 2022 we will use machine-learning algorithms and software to help us organize information about the physical world, helping bring the vast and complex data gathered by billions of devices within the range of our vision and understanding. We call this a "macroscope" – but unlike the microscope to see the very small, or the telescope that can see far away, it is a system of software and algorithms to bring all of Earth's complex data together to analyze it by space and time for meaning.

According to IBM in 2020, these "macroscope" principles were subsequently implemented as an experimental system named the "IBM PAIRS Geoscope", later re-badged as the Geospatial Analytics component within the IBM Environmental Intelligence Suite and described therein as "a platform specifically designed for massive geospatial-temporal (maps, satellite, weather, drone, IoT [="Internet of Things"]) query and analytics services".

For Craig Mundey of Microsoft, the benefits of the macroscope are not only for observation of the Earth, but also of aspects of the people on it:

As the Earth becomes increasingly instrumented with low-cost, high-bandwidth sensors, we will gain a better understanding of our environment via a virtual, distributed whole-Earth "macroscope"... Massive-scale data analytics will enable real-time tracking of disease and targeted responses to potential pandemics. Our virtual "macroscope" can now be used on ourselves, as well as on our planet (Microsoft Research, 2009).

Some 10 years later, during which time computing power and readily accessible data storage had continued to advance, Microsoft announced the planned development of its "Planetary Computer", an "approach to computing that is planetary in scale and allows us to query every aspect of environmental and nature-based solutions available in real time." Meanwhile, from around 2010 onwards, Google had already developed a somewhat similar facility entitled "Google Earth Engine" that uses cloud computing for numerical analysis of large quantities of satellite imagery; as at 2021, the project website states that "Google Earth Engine combines a multi-petabyte catalog of satellite imagery and geospatial datasets with planetary-scale analysis capabilities. Scientists, researchers, and developers use Earth Engine to detect changes, map trends, and quantify differences on the Earth's surface." Such initiatives can perhaps be viewed as the "high end" for ingestion of massive, global scale input datasets and associated computation; at the other end of the scale, the development of cross-platform (open) standards for the exchange of digitized geographic information by the Open Geospatial Consortium since the early 2000s has enabled researchers equipped with minimal software to request, display, overlay and otherwise interact with subsets of remote global data streams via (for example) Web Map Service (WMS), Web Feature Service (WFS) and Web Coverage Service (WCS) without a requirement to hold any of the data locally, capable of producing a type of "macroscope" functionality at modest cost (free in the case of open source solutions such as GeoServer, MapServer and more) for displaying information of the user's choice against a range of possible base maps. Other presently available solutions of a similar nature - where the client "virtual globe" software is installed either on the user's device or runs in a web browser, and can then access either remote, or locally held data layers for display over pre-prepared base maps - include NASA WorldWind and ESRI's ArcGIS Earth.

In 2013-2014, the New York City Department of Health and Mental Hygiene (DOHMH) designed their own "NYC Macroscope", a surveillance system for electronic health records of New York City residents, designed to "measure health outcomes among the NYC adult population actively seeking medical care".

The Indiana University School of Informatics and Computing also runs a mapping outreach program via its Cyberinfrastructure for Network Science Center entitled "Places and Spaces: Mapping Sciences" which in its 2016 program included "eight interactive macroscopes", accompanied by the following definition: "Macroscopes are software tools that help people focus on patterns in data that are too large or complex to see unaided. The world is a complex place, and macroscopes help us understand and manage that complexity. They are visual lenses we can use to see patterns and trends in large volumes of data." The associated "Places and Spaces" website, https://scimaps.org/ (2006 onwards) initially focused ("Phase 1") on ten iterations featuring static maps; "Phase 2" (2015 onwards) features 10 distinct dynamic / interactive "macroscopes", subsequently presented/extended as 40 macroscopes described in book form by Katy Börner and collaborators in 2025 (refer "Further reading").

Another initiative that has been referred to as a "macroscope" is the Ocean Biogeographic Information System (OBIS), as described by Vanden Berghe et al. in 2012, who wrote: "Its ambition to become a 'Macroscope' (de Rosnay, 1979) for marine biodiversity will allow us to see past complexities and the idiosyncrasies of individual datasets to see the "big picture" of ocean life more clearly", a key activity for this project being the transformation of data existing previously in disparate, and sometimes inaccessible forms into a single, standardized format for ease of access and the production of summary information as desired.

A putative "macroscope" of another variety is the Global Database of Events, Language, and Tone (GDELT Project), which monitors (most of) the world's news media creating "trillions of datapoints", then offering "realtime synthesis of global societal-scale behavior into a rich quantitative database allowing realtime monitoring and analytical exploration of those trends." According to the project's website, one of its outputs, the GDELT Global Knowledge Graph (GKG), compiles "a list of every person, organization, company, location and several million themes and thousands of emotions from every news report, using some of the most sophisticated named entity and geocoding algorithms in existence, designed specifically for the noisy and ungrammatical world that is the world's news media."

In 2018, 3 partner agencies - The United Nations Development Program (UNDP), the United Nations Environment (UN Environment), and the Secretariat of the Convention on Biological Diversity - launched the "UN Biodiversity Lab" (UNBL) (https://unbiodiversitylab.org/), described as "enhancing access to big data for sustainable development" in the form of global spatial data on protected areas, endangered species, human impact on natural systems, watersheds for key cities, and more. Version 2.0 of the UNBL, released in October 2021, reportedly contains "over 400 spatial data layers across biodiversity, climate change, and development", also offering workspaces where national-level users can upload their own data in order to compile maps for reporting purposes and nation-scale biodiversity planning and monitoring of biodiversity.

Some of the differences in approach described above are easier to understand if the macroscope is interpreted as a particular instance of the "value chain of big data" (with a particular focus on earth and/or biosphere observations), which as stated in Chen et al. (2014) can be divided into four phases, namely data generation, data acquisition (aka data assembly), data storage, and data analysis. For some workers such as M. Dornelas et al., the macroscope is the sum of the data collection systems (the generation element) that will provide the content that is needed for subsequent analysis, although some mention is also made of "a series of domain-specific data registries" which would then permit the content to be discovered. For others such as OBIS, the principal effort required to construct the macroscope is the data assembly component, which then permits the integrated analysis of previously disparate datasets (OBIS data can then either be viewed by the tools supplied, or downloaded to a user's own system for additional visualization and analysis); while for facilities interested in discovering patterns in the data (and with sufficient computing power to hand), the macroscope is the suite of temporal and spatial analytical and filtering tools ("lenses" in the terminology of the Indiana University Cyberinfrastructure for Network Science Center) which can be applied once the data are assembled. Since by analogy with the microscope, the macroscope is in essence a method of visualizing subjects too large to be seen completely in a conventional field of view, probably none of these approaches are incorrect, the differences in emphasis being complementary in that each is capable of contributing to the resulting "virtual instrument" that is envisaged by this concept. One trend that is observable, however, is that of increasing base dataset size and desired sampling density, today's "macroscopes" being built upon arrays of fine scale / high resolution data that would have been discarded as undesirable detail (obscuring the "big picture") in the original concepts of Odum and de Rosnay.

== Similar concepts ==
A number of the concepts described above either reappear, or are paralleled, in the alternatively-named "Geoscope" proposal by Buckminster Fuller in 1962, which was suggested to be a giant representation of the Globe upon which "all relevant inventories of world data" could be displayed via a system of computers. Among the benefits of such a system would be: "With the Geoscope humanity would be able to recognize formerly invisible patterns and thereby to forecast and plan in vastly greater magnitude than heretofore." A similar concept re-emerged as a more concrete proposal entitled "Digital Earth" espoused by then U.S. vice president Al Gore in 1998, progress towards which was reviewed in a 2015 survey paper by Mahdavi-Amiri et al.

== Contrasting terminology ==
The term macroscopic scale differs in usage from the science concept as discussed above; in essence it covers any item large enough to be seen with the unaided eye, in other words, not requiring a microscope to be visualized. Some authors also use "macroscopic" as part of a continuum of successively larger types of scale, commencing with microscopic, then macroscopic, then mesoscopic, and finally megascopic scales. By contrast, macro photography (short for macroscopic photography) is a term used to cover photographs where the subject appears magnified (greater than life size), strictly speaking at the film plane but in practice when reproduced as a print or on a screen, generally in the range of x1 to x10 magnification; while a Macroscope is also a designation for a type of optical microscope formerly marketed by the European manufacturers Wild Heerbrugg and Leica Microsystems, optimised for macro- and microphotography in the x8 to x40 magnification range; similar instruments, also under the name "Macroscopes", were also previously offered by other optical manufacturers including Bausch and Lomb, and Ednalite Research Corporation. Another use of the term "macroscope", pre-dating Odum's popularization of the science concept, occurs in the novelist Piers Anthony's 1969 science fiction book of the same name, in which his imaginary instrument is a sort of super-telescope, capable of focusing anywhere in space and time at the direction of the user, while in Jill Linz & Cindy Schwarz's 2009 children's novel Adventures in Atomville: The Macroscope, the titular instrument is a new invention by which atoms (which have identities in the book) can visualize the "outside world" for the first time. The term "macroscope" has also been employed in at least 2 instances in the names of commercial computer software products.

== See also ==
- Data fusion
- Digital Earth
- Earth observation
- Geospatial analysis
- Global Earth Observation System of Systems
- Landsat program
- Remote sensing
- Virtual globe
- Wireless sensor network
