= Virtual earth =

Virtual earth may refer to:

- Virtual ground, a node of an electrical circuit maintained at a steady reference potential
- Microsoft Virtual Earth, now Bing Maps for Enterprise, a geospatial mapping platform

== See also ==
- Digital earth
