= Microscope (disambiguation) =

A microscope is an instrument used to see objects that are too small to be seen by the naked eye.

Types of microscope include:

- Optical microscope
- Stereo microscope
- Digital microscope
  - USB microscope
- Electron microscope
  - Scanning electron microscope

Microscope may also refer to:

- MICROSCOPE (MICRO-Satellite à traînée Compensée pour l'Observation du Principe d'Equivalence), a satellite used to test the equivalence principle
- MicroScope (magazine), for the computer industry
- micro_scope, a film production company founded by Luc Déry and Kim McCraw
- Microscope (album), by Riz MC, 2011
- Microscope Gallery, an art gallery in Brooklyn, U.S.
- Microscopium, a constellation
- Microscope (role-playing game), a 2011 indie role-playing game

== See also ==
- Timeline of microscope technology
- Microscope image processing
- Virtual microscope
- Microscopy (research field)
- Microscopy Listserver, for professional microscopy
- Microscopy and Microanalysis journal
- Microscopic (EP)
- Microscopic scale
- Macroscope (disambiguation)
