= Macroscope =

Macroscope may refer to:

- Macroscope (Wild-Leica), a type of optical microscope
- Macroscope (science concept), a method appropriate to the study of large objects or complex processes
- Macroscope (methodology suite), an integrated methodology suite for enterprise IT activities
- Macroscope (novel), a 1969 novel by Piers Anthony
- Macroscope (album), a 2014 album by the Nels Cline Singers

== See also ==
- Macroscopic scale
- Macroscopic limit
- Optical microscope
- Earth observation
