= International Society for Digital Earth =

The International Society for Digital Earth is an international non-profit organization dedicated to promoting the Digital Earth concept. It publishes the International Journal of Digital Earth. It is recognized as one of the main international Geospatial Societies by the United Nations Committee of Experts on Global Geospatial Information Management. It is also a member of the Group on Earth Observations.
