= International Journal of Digital Earth =

- Discipline: Geography, Remote sensing
- Language: English

Publication details
- Publisher: Taylor & Francis

Standard abbreviations
- ISO 4: Int. J. Digit. Earth

Indexing
- ISSN: 1753-8947 (print); 1753-8955 (web)

The International Journal of Digital Earth is an academic journal about Digital Earth published by Taylor & Francis on behalf of the International Society for Digital Earth. It focuses on concepts such as "Earth observation, geographic information systems and [geographic information] science". Its editor-in-chief is Guo Huadong; its 2018 impact factor is 3.985.
