= Geovisualization =

Visualization of geospatial data

Geovisualization or geovisualisation (short for geographic visualization), also known as cartographic visualization, refers to a set of tools and techniques supporting the analysis of Geographic data through the use of interactive visualization.

Like the related fields of scientific visualization and information visualization geovisualization emphasizes knowledge construction over knowledge storage or information transmission. To do this, geovisualization communicates geospatial information in ways that, when combined with human understanding, allow for data exploration and decision-making processes.

Traditional, static maps have a limited exploratory capability; the graphical representations are inextricably linked to the geographical information beneath. GIS and geovisualization allow for more interactive maps; including the ability to explore different layers of the map, to zoom in or out, and to change the visual appearance of the map, usually on a computer display. Geovisualization represents a set of cartographic technologies and practices that take advantage of the ability of modern microprocessors to render changes to a map in real time, allowing users to adjust the mapped data on the fly.

== History ==
The term visualization is first mentioned in the cartographic literature at least as early as 1953, in an article by University of Chicago geographer Allen K. Philbrick. New developments in the field of computer science prompted the National Science Foundation to redefine the term in a 1987 report which placed visualization at the convergence of computer graphics, image processing, computer vision, computer-aided design, signal processing, and user interface studies and emphasized both the knowledge creation and hypothesis generation aspects of scientific visualization.

Geovisualization developed as a field of research in the early 1980s, based largely on the work of French graphic theorist Jacques Bertin. Bertin's work on cartographic design and information visualization shares with the National Science Foundation report a focus on the potential for the use of "dynamic visual displays as prompts for scientific insight and on the methods through which dynamic visual displays might leverage perceptual cognitive processes to facilitate scientific thinking".

Geovisualization has continued to grow as a subject of practice and research. The International Cartographic Association (ICA) established a Commission on Visualization & Virtual Environments in 1995.

== Related fields ==
Geovisualization is closely related to other visualization fields, such as scientific visualization and information visualization. Owing to its roots in cartography, geovisualization contributes to these other fields by way of the map metaphor, which "has been widely used to visualize non-geographic information in the domains of information visualization and domain knowledge visualization." It is also related to urban simulation.

== Applications ==
Geovisualization has made inroads in a diverse set of real-world situations calling for the decision-making and knowledge creation processes it can provide. The following list provides a summary of some of these applications as they are discussed in the geovisualization literature.

=== Wildland fire fighting ===
Firefighters have been using sandbox environments to rapidly and physically model topography and fire for wildfire incident command strategic planning. The SimTable is a 3D interactive fire simulator, bringing sandtable exercises to life. The SimTable uses advanced computer simulations to model fires in any area, including local neighborhoods, utilizing actual slope, terrain, wind speed/direction, vegetation, and other factors. SimTable models were used in Arizona's largest fire on record, the Wallow Fire.

=== Forestry ===
Geovisualizers, working with European foresters, used CommonGIS and Visualization Toolkit (VTK) to visualize a large set of spatio-temporal data related to European forests, allowing the data to be explored by non-experts over the Internet. The report summarizing this effort "uncovers a range of fundamental issues relevant to the broad field of geovisualization and information visualization research".

The research team cited the two major problems as the inability of the geovisualizers to convince the foresters of the efficacy of geovisualization in their work and the foresters' misgivings over the dataset's accessibility to non-experts engaging in "uncontrolled exploration". While the geovisualizers focused on the ability of geovisualization to aid in knowledge construction, the foresters preferred the information-communication role of more traditional forms of cartographic representation.

=== Archaeology ===
Geovisualization provides archaeologists with a potential technique for mapping unearthed archaeological environments as well as for accessing and exploring archaeological data in three dimensions.

The implications of geovisualization for archaeology are not limited to advances in archaeological theory and exploration but also include the development of new, collaborative relationships between archaeologists and computer scientists.

=== Environmental studies ===
Geovisualization tools provide multiple stakeholders with the ability to make balanced environmental decisions by taking into account "the complex interacting factors that should be taken into account when studying environmental changes". Geovisualization users can use a georeferenced model to explore a complex set of environmental data, interrogating a number of scenarios or policy options to determine a best fit.

=== Urban planning ===
Both planners and the general public can use geovisualization to explore real-world environments and model 'what if' scenarios based on spatio-temporal data. While geovisualization in the preceding fields may be divided into two separate domains—the private domain, in which professionals use geovisualization to explore data and generate hypotheses, and the public domain, in which these professionals present their "visual thinking" to the general public—planning relies more heavily than many other fields on collaboration between the general public and professionals.

Planners use geovisualization as a tool for modeling the environmental interests and policy concerns of the general public. Jiang et al. mention two examples, in which "3D photorealistic representations are used to show urban redevelopment [and] dynamic computer simulations are used to show possible pollution diffusion over the next few years." The widespread use of the Internet by the general public has implications for these collaborative planning efforts, leading to increased participation by the public while decreasing the amount of time it takes to debate more controversial planning decisions.

== See also ==
- Animated mapping
- Cartography
- Comparison of geographic information systems software
- Computer-aided design
- Computer graphics
- Computer vision
- Exploratory data analysis
- Geographic information science
- Geographic information systems
- Geography
- Geoinformatics
- Geoscope
- Image processing
- Signal processing
- Technical geography
- Quantitative geography
