= Geoscope =

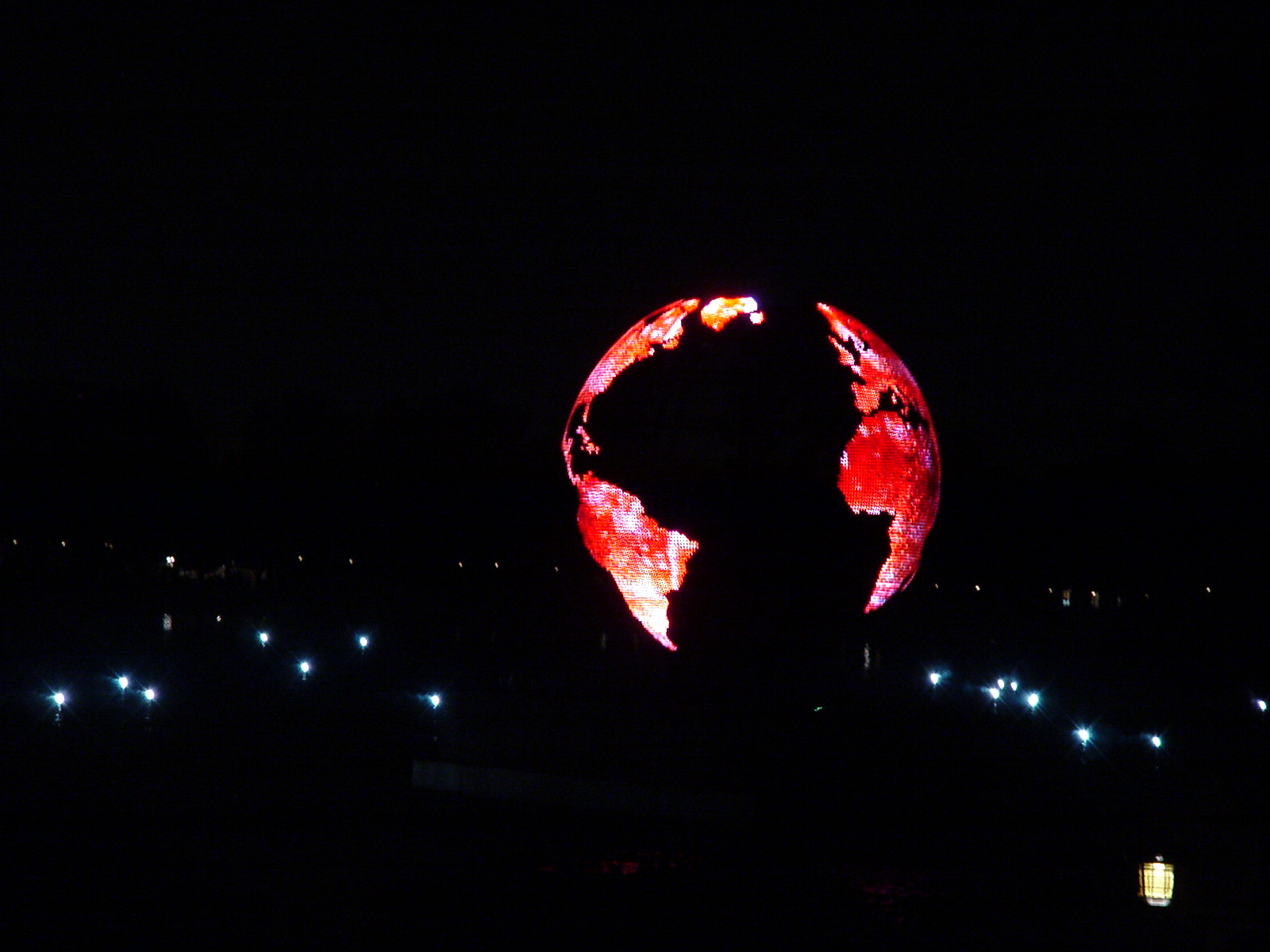
A large video globe used in the IllumiNations: Reflections of Earth show (1999–2019) at Epcot theme park resembled Buckminster Fuller's earlier Geoscope proposal.

The Geoscope was a proposal by Buckminster Fuller around 1960 to create a 200-foot-diameter (61 m) globe that would be covered in colored lights so that it could function as a large spherical display. It was envisioned that the Geoscope would be connected to computers which would allow it to display both historical and current data, and enable people to visualize large scale patterns around the world. Several projects by his students to build a "miniature Earth", starting with a 20-foot version at Cornell University in 1952, were precursors of the Geoscope proposal. Before proposing the Geoscope, Fuller had invented the Dymaxion map, a novel map projection for the whole Earth.

Many of Fuller's ideas for the functions of the Geoscope are now being realized by virtual globes.

Fuller did not limit his use of the term "Geoscope" to the 200 foot (61 m) diameter globe proposed for installation near the headquarters of the United Nations in New York City (on a ledge of rocks in the middle of the East River now named U Thant Island). He also used it to refer to smaller globes to be viewed from the inside outwards toward the stars.

In Fuller's book Critical Path he advocated for constructing many Geoscopes as large see-through spheres shaped and oriented like the planet Earth. By standing inside, one could view the stars exactly as they appear to anyone standing at any point on Earth. Computers for each Geoscope will "store all relevant inventories of world data arranged chronologically, in the order and spacing of discovery, as they have occurred throughout all known history". Time-lapse images projected onto the Geoscope would display in a matter of minutes all sorts of global, long-term trends, everything from continental drift to human migration to use of transportation. With the Geoscope humanity would be able to recognize formerly invisible patterns and thereby to forecast and plan in vastly greater magnitude than heretofore.

== See also ==
- Data fusion
- Data visualization
- Digital Earth
- Earth observation
- Fulldome video
- Geovisualization
- Historical geographic information system
- IllumiNations: Reflections of Earth § Earth Globe
- Macrohistory
- Macroscope (science concept)
- Planetarium
- Sphere (venue)
- Video wall
