= Macro photography =

Photography genre and techniques of extreme close-up pictures

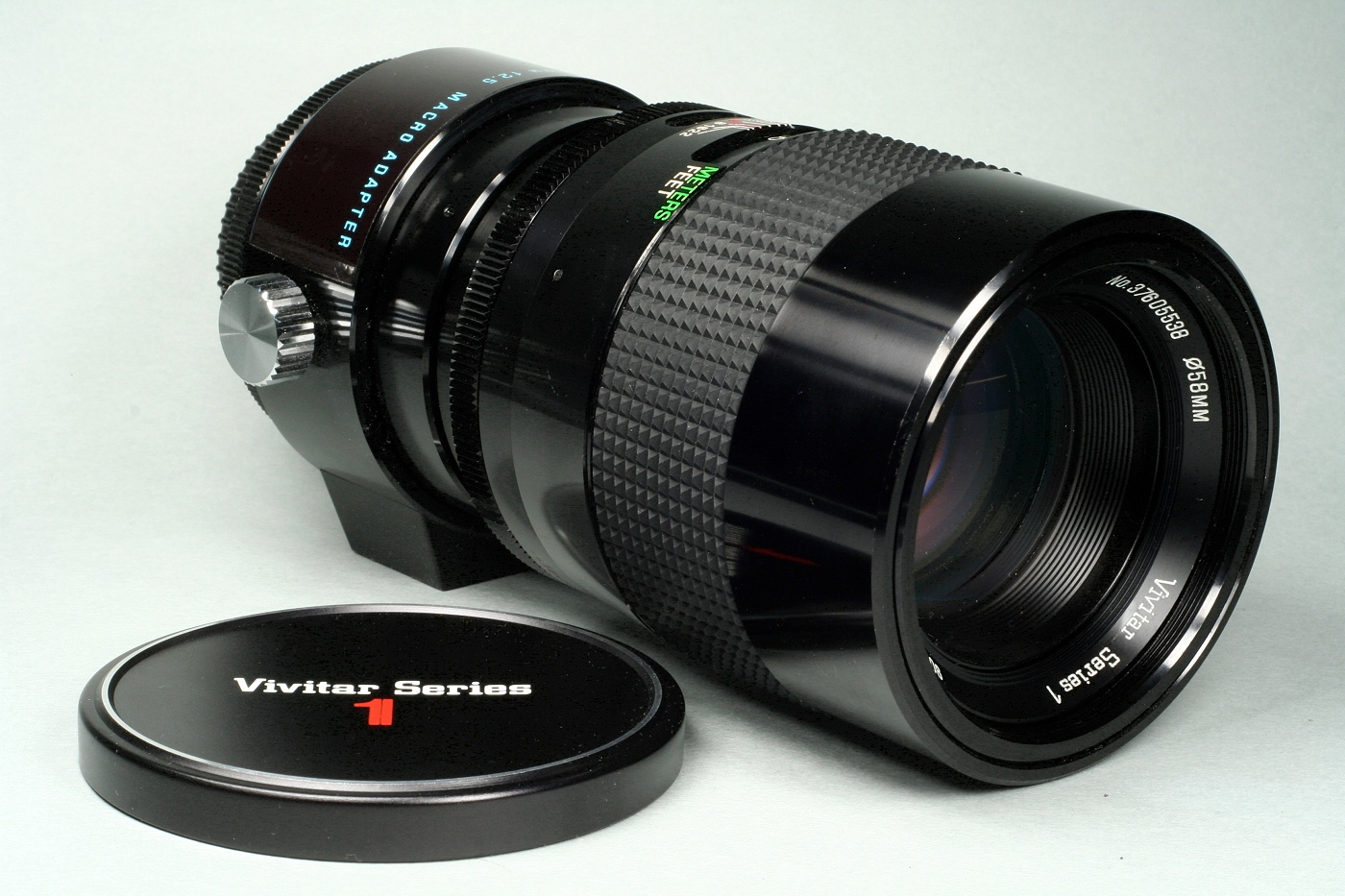
Use of a dedicated macro lens, such as the Vivitar Series 1 90 mm f/2.5 shown here, is one of many methods to achieve the large reproduction ratio required for photomacrography.

Macro photography, also called photomacrography or macrography, and sometimes macrophotography, (Note: An alternative definition for macrophotography, not discussed in this article, refers to the art of making very large photographs, such as those generated by the Polaroid 20×24 camera.) is extreme close-up photography in which the subject is reproduced at greater than its actual size. Macro photographs usually feature very small subjects and living organisms like insects.

== Definitions ==
The optical reproduction ratio is the subject size captured on the film frame (or image sensor) compared to the actual subject size, and is a function of the lens design. The optical magnification m is equivalent to optical reproduction ratio. For example, an optical reproduction ratio of 1:10 means the image is recorded at 1/10th of the actual subject size, and the equivalent optical magnification is 1/10×, 0.10×, or 10%. In the strictest definition, a macro photograph is one in which the size of the image captured is life-size or larger (i.e., optical reproduction ratio ≥ 1:1) compared to the original subject.

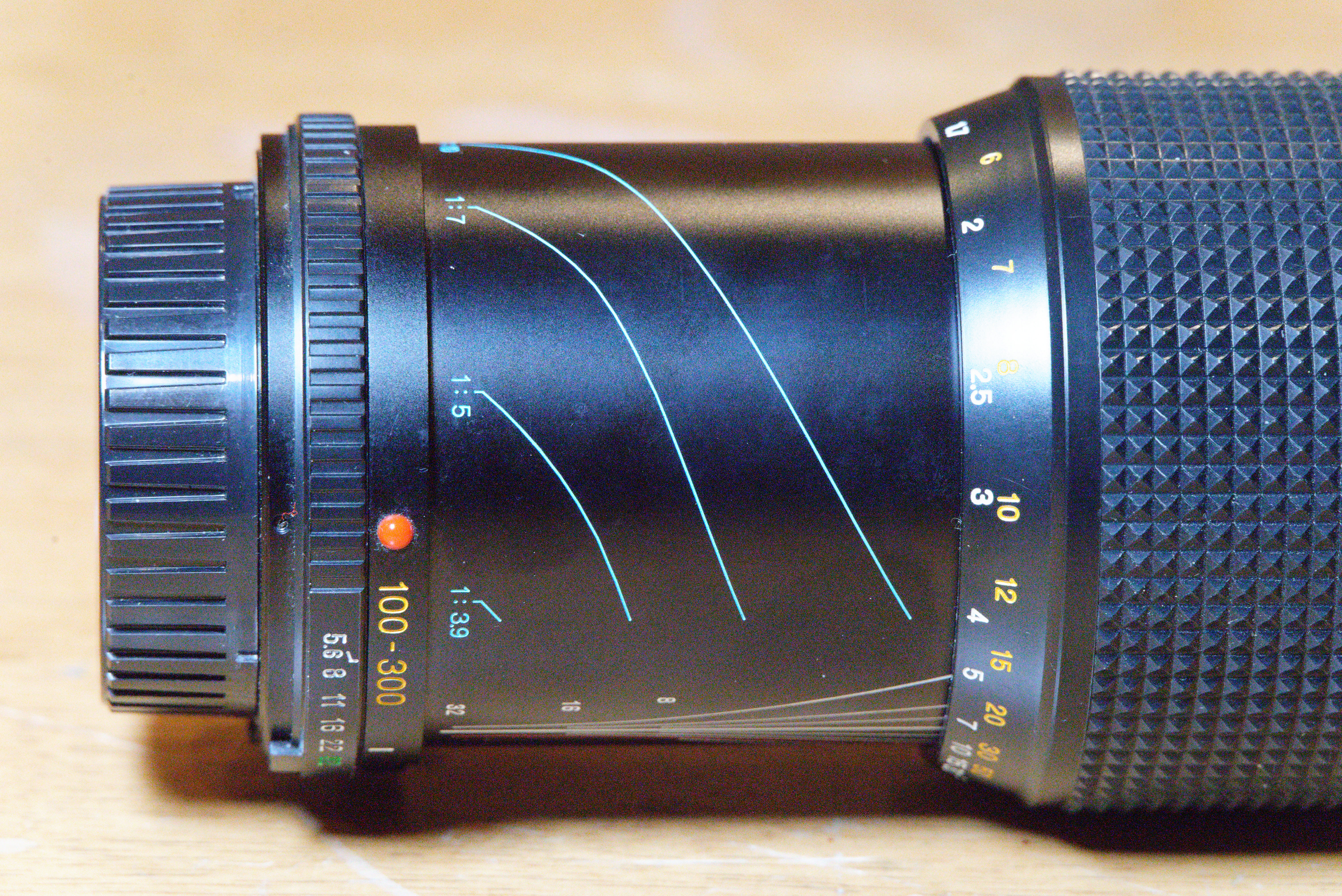
Minolta Zoom-Rokkor 100–300mm lens with markings for reproduction ratio

A macro lens is therefore a lens capable of optical reproduction ratios of 1:1 or greater (e.g., 2:1, 3:1, etc.). Rudolf Kingslake gives a broader definition of a macro lens as one "which is well corrected for use over a wide range of object distances."

Since the size of the image on the negative or image sensor is rarely the subject of discussion except in technical photography and film-based processes, the final image (e.g., as printed, displayed in a magazine, or on a web page) is a more relevant measure of displayed size. Define the final magnification M (or final reproduction ratio) as the image size on the final print divided by the original object size. This definition of final reproduction ratio compares the size of the finished image, as displayed, with the actual size of the subject. Because the displayed image usually is larger than the film frame or image sensor, the final reproduction ratio is the product of the optical reproduction ratio (determined by the lens) and the magnification in reproducing the recorded image from the sensor or film to the display.

This means the subject will more likely be displayed at greater than life-size, and so the final displayed image more commonly lends a photograph macro (i.e., >1:1) status. For example, when producing a 6×4 in (150×100 mm) print using an image captured on a 35 format (36×24 mm) film or sensor, the printing process results in an inherent 4:1 magnification in going from the sensor to the print, which means a life-size result is possible with a lens set at a 1:4 optical reproduction ratio.

Typical magnification ranges
Term	Typical mag.
Close-Up	0.1–0.5×
Extreme Close-Up	0.5–1.0×
Macro	1.0–35×

Using the more expansive definition provided by Kingslake and considering the final reproduction ratio, many photographic lenses designed and sold with "macro" focusing ranges actually fall into the "close-up" range of optical magnifications, with a maximum optical reproduction ratio between 1:2 and 1:1. However, even 1:2 is significantly larger than non-macro lenses, as those often are designed with a maximum reproduction ratio (i.e., at closest focus) of approximately 1:10 for practical and optical considerations.

Reproduction ratios much greater than 10:1 are considered to be photomicrography, (Note: Photomicrography should not be confused with microphotography, the art of making very small photographs, such as for microforms. Unlike most other lens makers, Nikon designates its macro lenses with a "Micro" prefix because of their original use in making microform.) often achieved with optical microscopes.

== History ==
The term photo-macrograph was proposed in 1899 by W. H. Walmsley for close-up images with less than 10 diameters magnification, to distinguish from true photo-micrographs.

Development of the photo-micrograph led to the evolution of macro photography.

An early pioneer of close-up nature filming was the British filmmaker F. Percy Smith (1880–1945), whose close-up studies, time-lapse films of plant growth and micro-cinematography included The Birth of a Flower (1911) and the Secrets of Nature series, begun in 1922.

== Equipment and techniques ==
=== Macro lenses ===
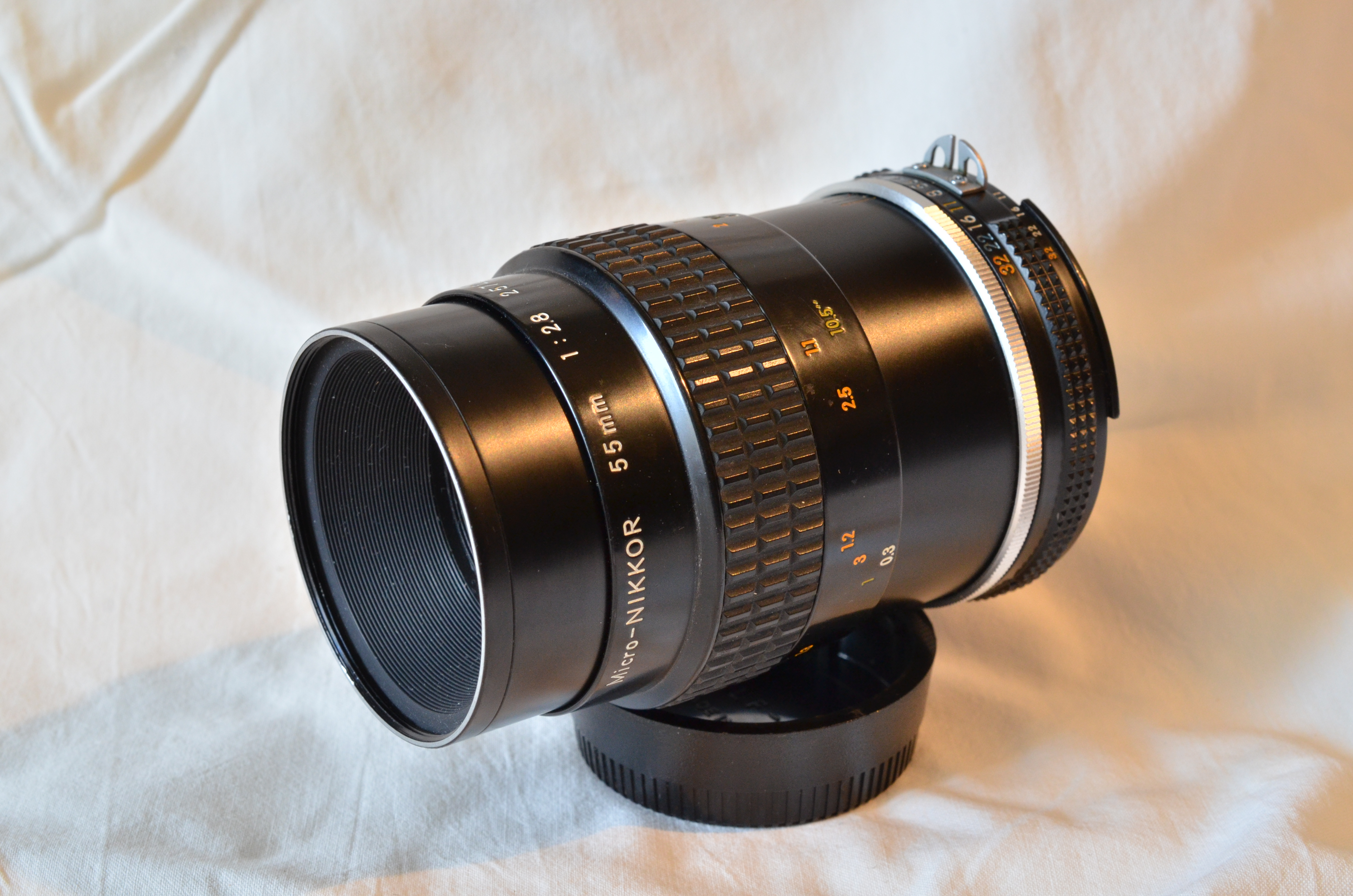
Micro-Nikkor 55 mm f/2.8 Ai-S lens, at full barrel extension

Lenses with a "macro" focusing feature are specifically designed for close-up work, with a longer barrel extension mechanism than conventional lenses and optics optimized for high reproduction ratios; these are the most common tools for macro photography. Most modern macro lenses focus continuously from an optical reproduction ratio of 1:1 or 1:2 to infinity and can provide excellent optical quality for normal photography, although these should technically be called "close-up" lenses.

When using these "macro" lenses at a reproduction ratio greater than 2:1, they should be reversed. Alternatively, a teleconverter may be used with a "macro" lens to achieve reproduction ratios of up to 6:1 with reasonable working distances. For classic "macro" lenses, the focal length is fixed and all of the optical elements move as a unit during focusing. The magnification m can be computed from the extension distance d and lens focal length F:

$$m=\frac{d}{F}$$

More recent macro lens designs include "floating" elements, which decrease the amount of extension needed to achieve a 1:1 optical reproduction ratio and facilitate autofocus operation. The effective focal length for lenses with floating elements typically decreases at minimum focus, and the effective focal length can be determined by comparing the observed lens extension for a given magnification to those same values at a reference point:

$$F_{eff} = \frac {\left ( d - d_{ref} \right )}{\left ( m - m_{ref} \right )}$$

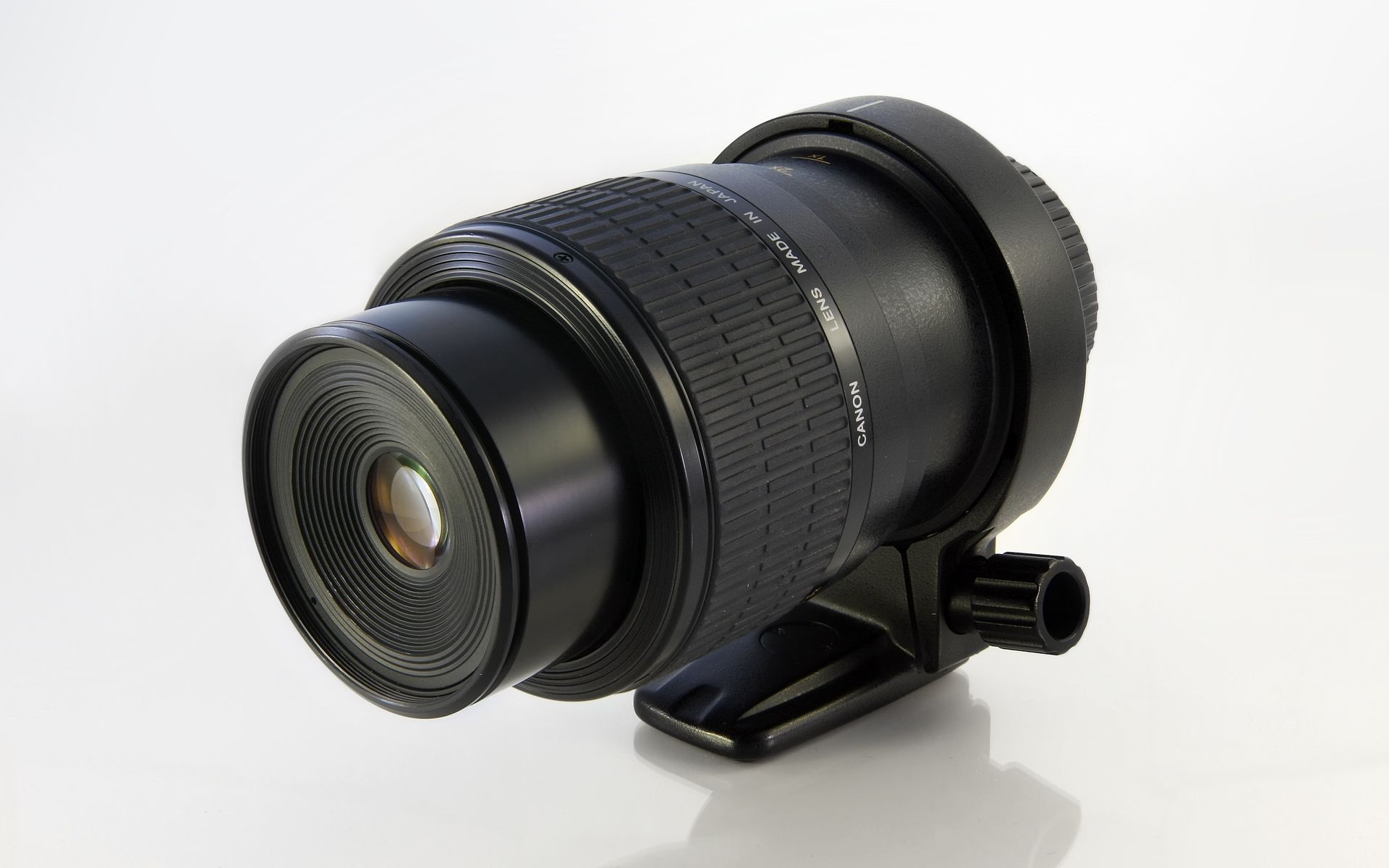
Canon MP-E 65 mm macro lens. Small front lens elements are typical of macro lenses.

True macro lenses offer a maximum optical reproduction ratio of 1:1 or greater, such as the Canon MP-E 65mm f/2.8 1-5x Macro, Laowa 25mm f/2.8 2.5–5X Ultra Macro (a relatively shorter focal length), Yasuhara Nanoha 4–5X, or Minolta AF 3–1x f/1.7–2.8 Macro; by achieving higher magnification than life size, photographs can be taken of the structure of small insect eyes, snowflakes, and other minuscule objects. However, these lenses generally lose the ability to focus to infinity and cannot be used for general purpose photography. Others, such as the Infinity Photo-Optical's TS-160 can achieve magnifications from 0–18× on sensor, focusing from infinity to 18 mm from the object.

Macro lenses are sold with different focal lengths for specific uses:

- Continuously variable focal length – suitable for virtually all macro subjects
- "Normal" 45–65 mm – general purposes: product photography, document reproduction, small objects that can be approached closely without causing undesirable influence, and scenes requiring natural background perspective
- "Portrait" 90–105 mm – insects, flowers, and small objects from a comfortable distance
- "Telephoto" 150–200 mm – insects and other small animals where additional working distance is required

=== Mechanical extension ===
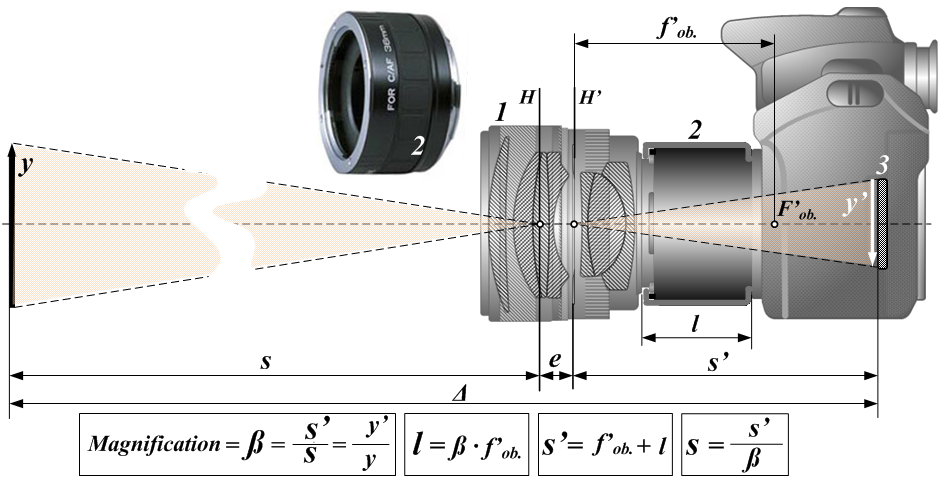
Optical scheme of macro photography using extension tube

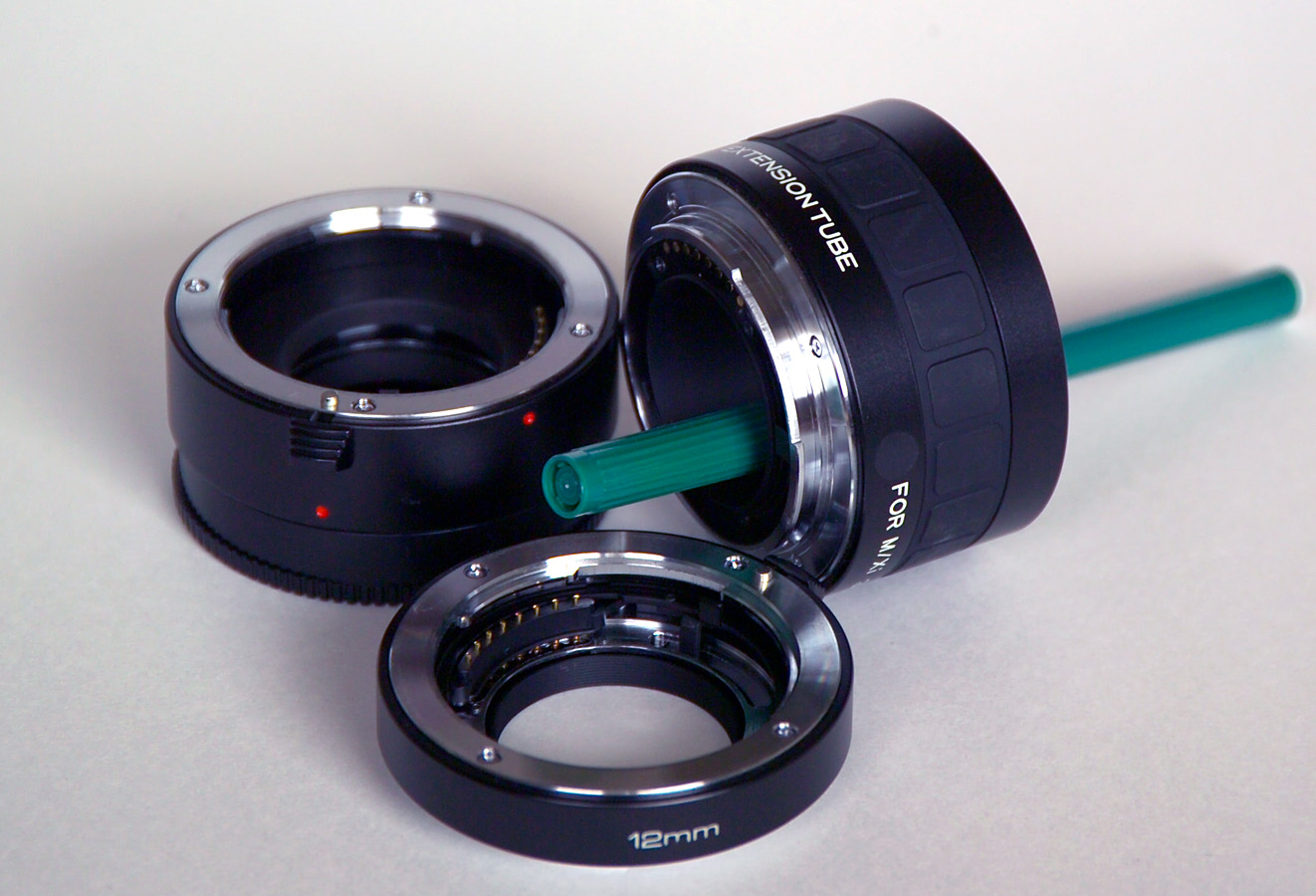
Extension tubes for extreme macro use with SLRs. Note the pen placed through the tube to illustrate that it does not contain any lens elements.

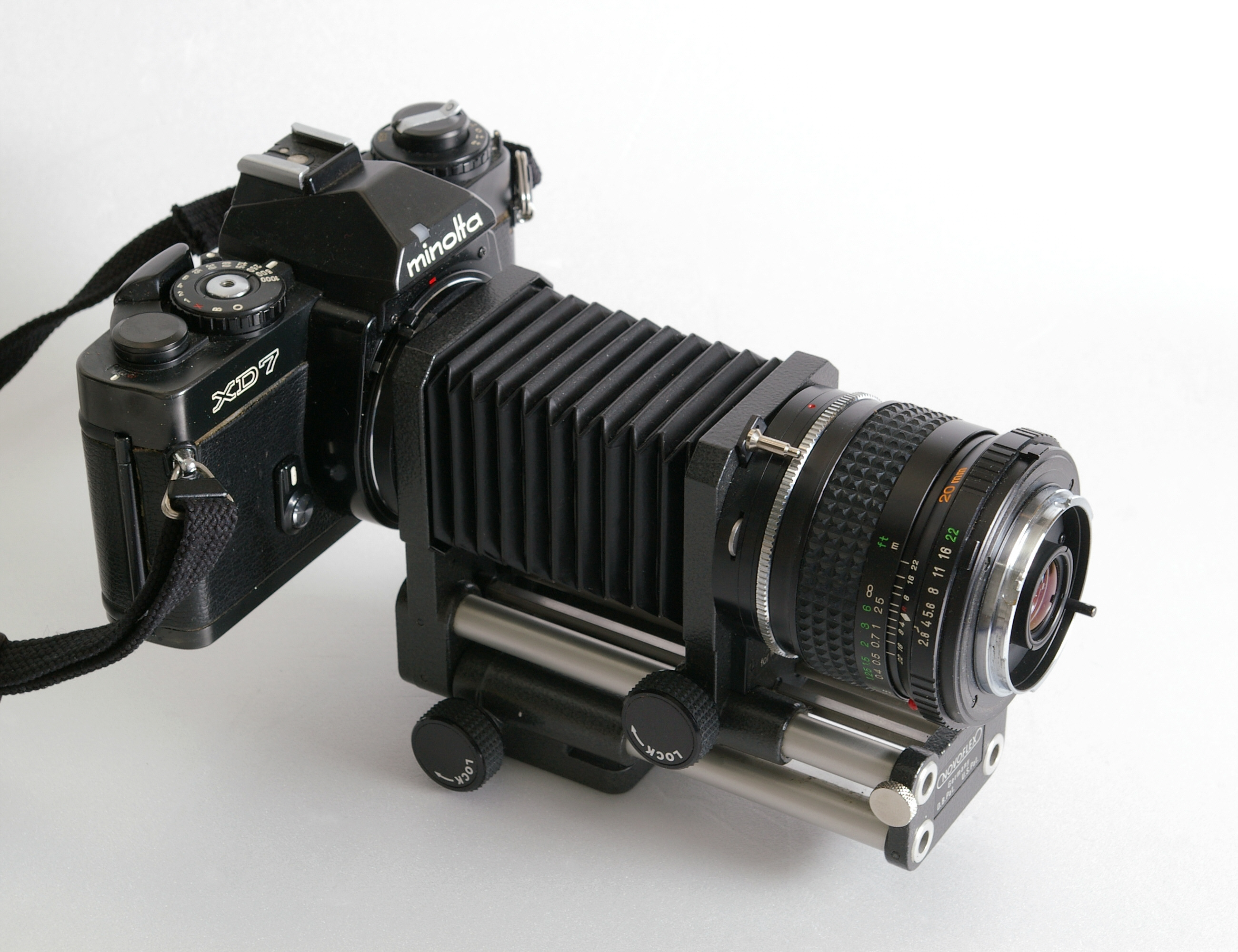
Bellows fitted between an SLR and reversed lens

Extending the distance between the lens and the film or sensor, by inserting either extension tubes or a continuously adjustable bellows, is another equipment option for macro photography. As the lens is extended further from the film or sensor, the closest focusing distance decreases, the magnification increases in direct proportion to the lens extension; recall that $m=\frac{d}{F}$. In addition, the image exposure needs to be increased when focusing closer, whether by using a slower shutter speed or wider aperture.

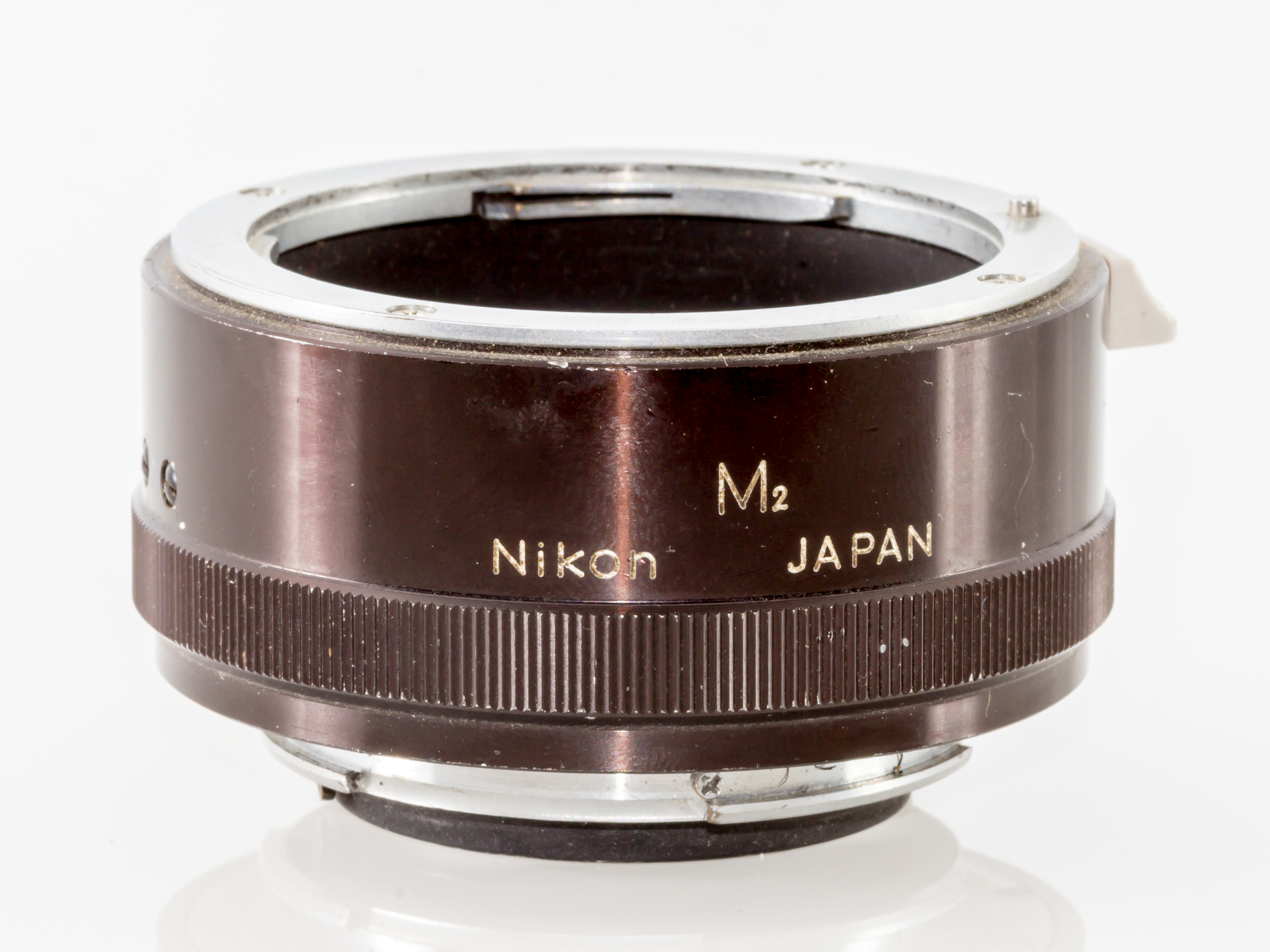
This Nikon M2 extension tube provides 27.5 mm of extension and increases the maximum reproduction ratio of the 55 f/3.5 Micro-Nikkor lens to 1:1

For many "macro" lenses with a maximum optical reproduction ratio of 1:2, a specific accessory extension tube often is available with a fixed extension distance of F/2; with it mounted, the "macro" lens loses infinity focus but the focus range can be adjusted from 1:2 to 1:1.

Generally, extension tubes are rigid and provide a fixed increase in distance, and bellows are flexible, allowing a variable increase in distance. The extension range of bellows generally varies between 50 and 200 mm (2.0 and 7.9 in), resulting in a range of potential magnifications between 1:1 and 4:1 using a 50 mm lens. Tubes of various lengths can be stacked, decreasing lens-to-subject distance and increasing magnification. Some tubes incorporate a focusing helicoid which provide a variable extension length, albeit more limited than the potential range of extension when using a bellows; the extension tube equipped with a helicoid generally offers more rigidity and durability than a bellows.

Bellows or tubes shorten the available maximum focus distance and generally make it impossible to focus to infinity. To maintain infinity focus, special short-mount lenses may be available for use with bellows; these specialized lenses usually have just an aperture control without a focusing helicoid, as focusing is handled by the bellows itself.

=== Auxiliary lenses ===
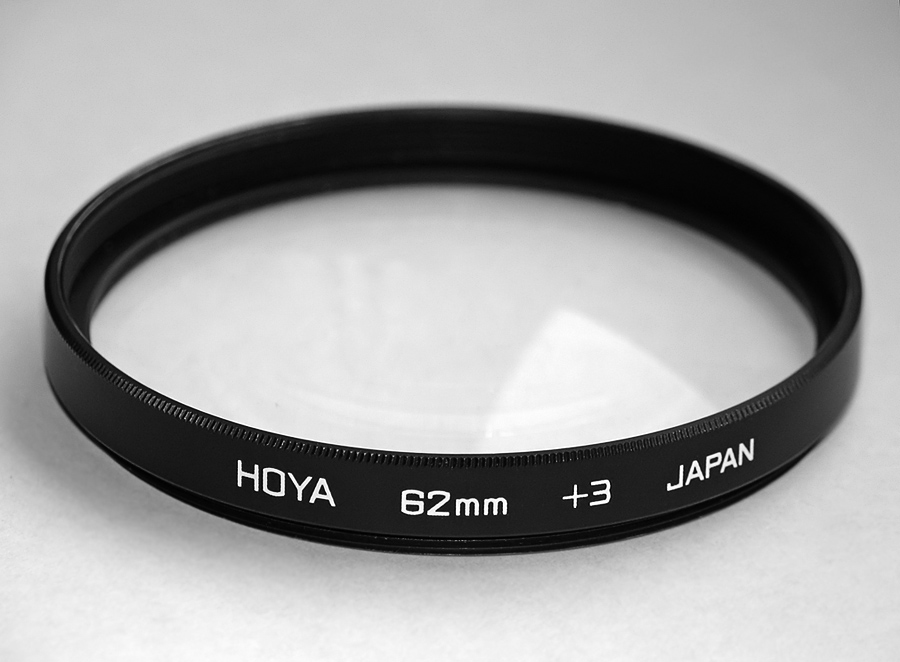
This auxiliary close-up lens has a +3 diopter rating

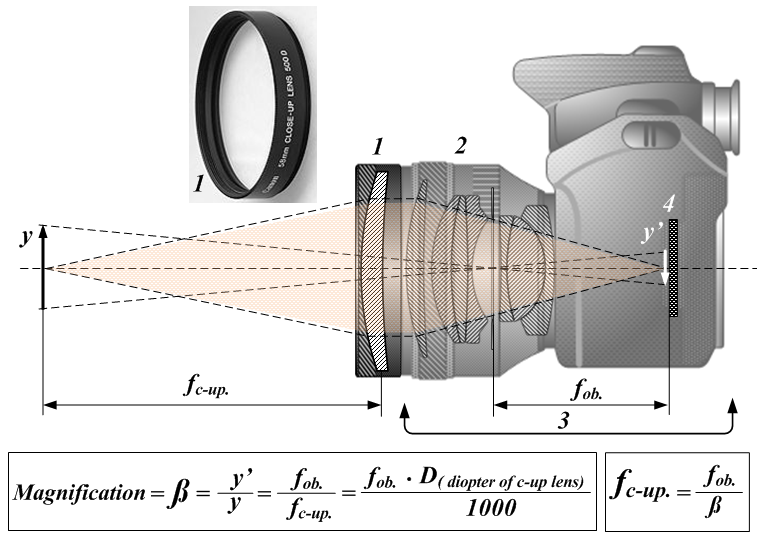
Optical scheme of close-up macro photography with an auxiliary lens

Placing an auxiliary close-up lens (or close-up "filter") in front of the camera's lens is another option. These are generally inexpensive screw-in or slip-on attachments that will reduce the closest focusing distance. The possible quality is less than that of a dedicated macro lens or extension tubes; some two-element auxiliary lenses are very good while many inexpensive single element lenses exhibit chromatic aberration and reduced sharpness of the resulting image. This method works with cameras that have fixed lenses, and is commonly used with bridge cameras.

The optical power of these auxiliary close-up lenses are measured in the dimensionless value of diopters, where the diopter D is equal to the reciprocal of the focal length of the auxiliary lens $F_{aux}$, in meters. In other words,

$$D = \frac {1 m}{F_{aux}}$$

Close-up lens data
Diopter	$F_{aux}$ = Working dist. W	$F_{c}$ (mm) (Note: With 50 mm host lens.)	Mag. m (Note: Host lens focus distance set to infinity.)
+0.5	2,000 mm (79 in)	48.8	0.03×
+0.7	1,429 mm (56.3 in)	48.3	0.04×
+1.0	1,000 mm (39 in)	47.6	0.05×
+1.5	667 mm (26.3 in)	46.5	0.08×
+2.0	500 mm (20 in)	45.5	0.1×
+3.0	333 mm (13.1 in)	43.5	0.15×
+4.0	250 mm (9.8 in)	41.7	0.2×
+5.0	200 mm (7.9 in)	40	0.25×
+10.0	100 mm (3.9 in)	33.3	0.5×

The working distance W of the combination of the host lens and auxiliary lens is equal to the focal length of the auxiliary lens when the host lens is set to infinity. In other words, the working distance, defined as the distance from the lens to the subject, can be computed from the diopter D as:

$$W = F_{aux} = \frac {1 m}{D} = \frac {100 cm}{D} = \frac {1000 mm}{D}$$

When a close-up lens is attached, the host lens loses the ability to focus to infinity, but the host lens may be focused closer to increase the reproduction ratio. However, it may be more convenient to simply shift the entire camera and lens towards or away from the subject to find the correct focus.

The approximate magnification of the combined host and auxiliary lenses is the ratio of the focal lengths, which can be rewritten in terms of diopters:

$$m = \frac {F}{F_{aux}} = \frac {F}{\left ( \frac {1000mm}{D} \right )} = \frac {F \cdot D}{1000mm}$$

The effective combined focal length can be computed from the original focal length of the host lens F (in mm) and diopter:

$$F_c = \frac {1000 mm}{\left ( \frac {1000 mm}{F} + D \right )} = \frac {1000 mm}{\left ( \frac {1000 mm}{F} + \frac {1000 mm}{F_{aux}} \right )} = \frac {F \cdot F_{aux}}{F + F_{aux}}$$

For example, consider the combination of a close-up lens with a diopter of +1.5 and a 50 mm host lens. The focal length of the close-up lens by itself is 2/3 m, or 667 mm. When the host (50 mm) lens is set to infinity, the combined working distance is 66.7 cm (26.3 in) and the combined focal length is 46.5 mm, giving a magnification of 0.08×. Because the resulting combined focal length is not much different than that of the host lens (50 mm), virtually no exposure compensation is required.

If the same +1.5 close-up lens is used with a 28 mm wide-angle or 105 mm telephoto lens, the combined working distance remains the same (approximately equal to the focal length of the close-up lens itself), but the combined focal length changes to 26.9 mm with the 28 mm lens and 90.7 mm with the 105 mm lens, and the resulting magnification is 0.04× and 0.16× for the 28 mm and 105 mm respectively, which is approximately half and double that magnification using the same auxiliary close-up lens with the 50 mm host lens.

If a +0.7 diopter auxiliary close-up lens is used with a 105 mm telephoto lens, the working distance is 142.9 cm (56.3 in) and the combined focal length is 97.8 mm, giving a magnification of 0.07×, which is almost the same magnification achieved using a +1.5 diopter with a 50 mm lens. This means that increasing the focal length of the host lens will result in a greater working distance while maintaining a given magnification by using a weaker close-up lens.

Auxiliary close-up lenses can be stacked (with an additional loss of quality) to achieve the desired magnification. The higher-powered lens (as indicated by a larger diopter) should be attached closer to the host lens. In general, when using close-up auxiliary lenses, magnification should be limited to a maximum of 1:2 and the host lens should be stopped down.

=== Selective focus ===
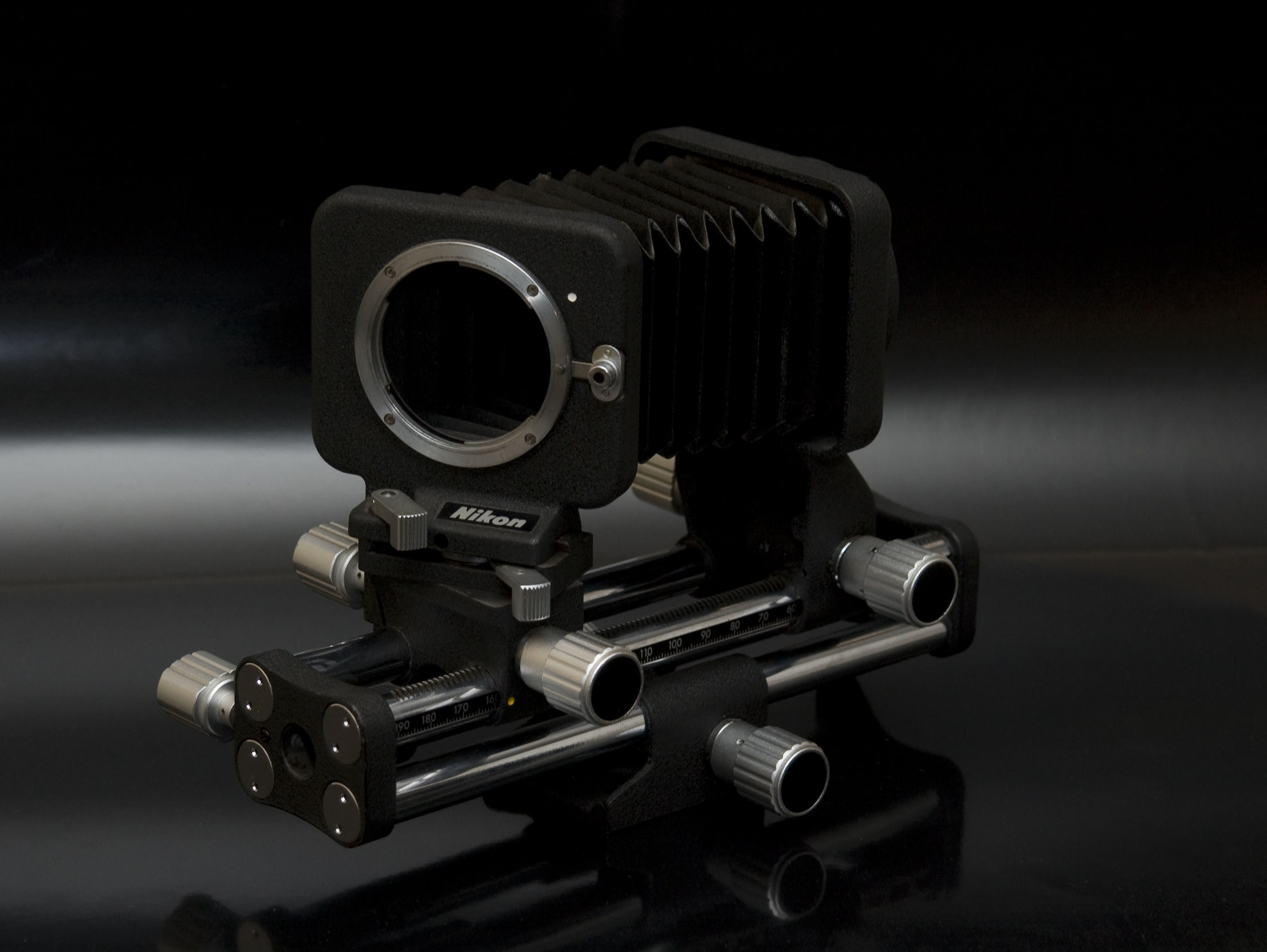
Nikon PB-4 with tilt movement

Photographers may employ view camera movements and the Scheimpflug principle to place an object close to the lens in focus, while maintaining selective background focus. This technique requires the ability to tilt the lens with respect to the film or sensor plane.

Traditional view cameras permit such adjustment as part of their design. For smaller formats, some older bellows units first released in the 1970s are equipped with a mechanical adjustment to allow tilts and shifts on the front (lens) standard, including the Nikon PB-4 and Minolta Auto Bellows III. Other specialized perspective control lenses such as the Nikon PC-E and Canon TS-E series, the Hartblei Super-Rotator, the Schneider Super Angulon, several Lensbaby models, the Zoerk Multi Focus System, and various tilt-shift adapters for medium format, allow the use of tilt in cameras with fixed lens mounts.

=== Reversed and stacked lenses ===
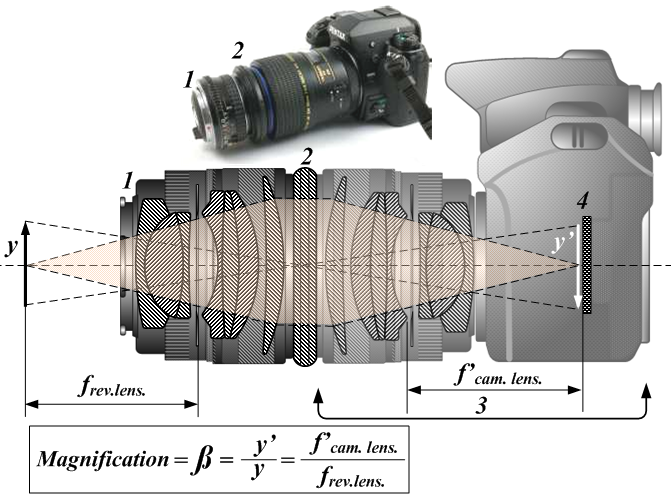
Reversed-lens macro photography optical scheme

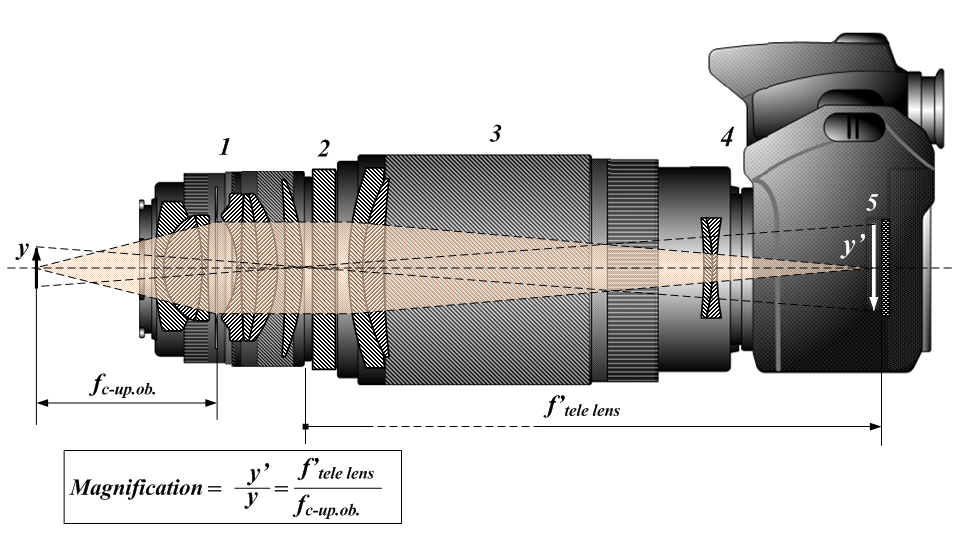
Optical scheme of macro photography using reversed lens and telephoto lens

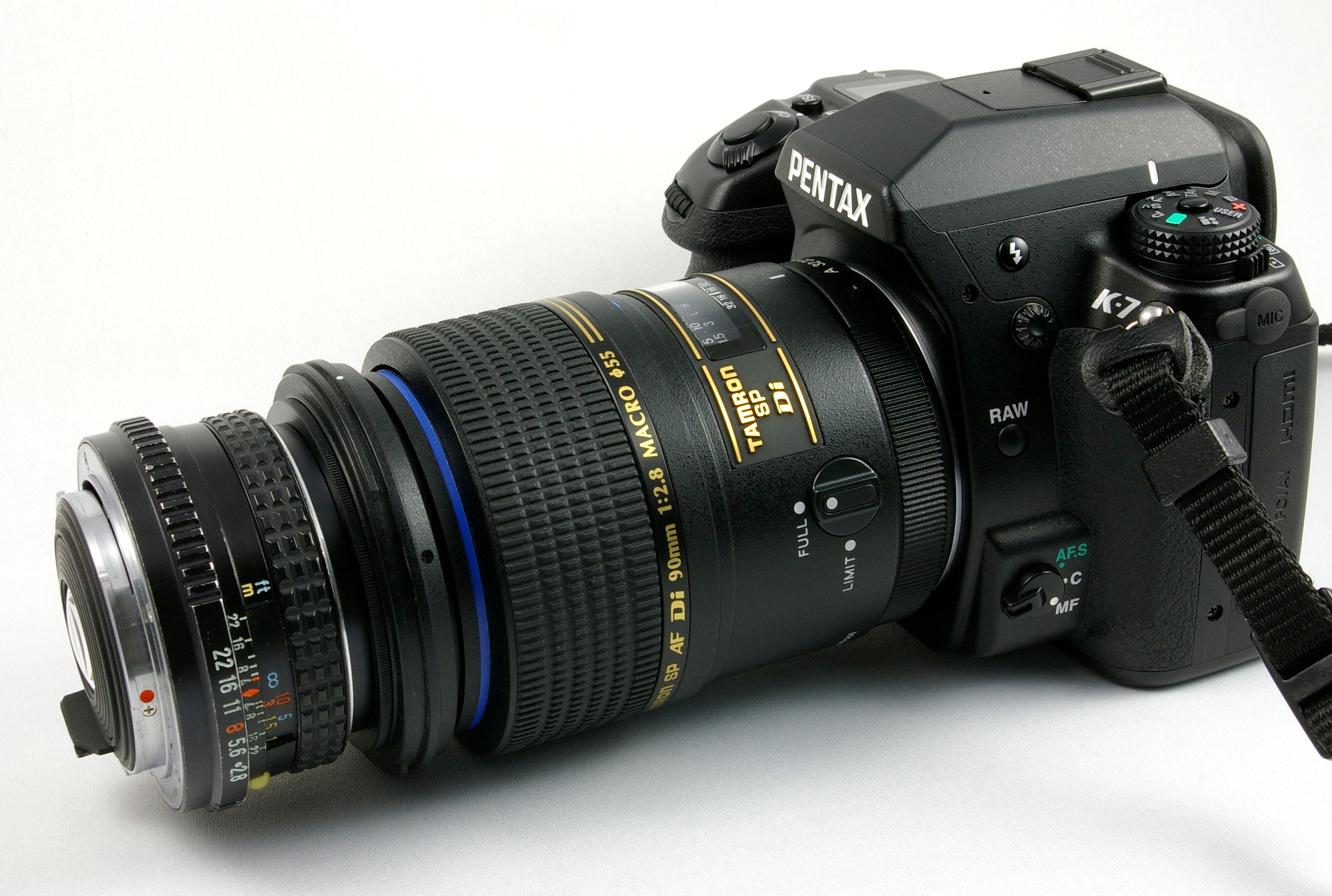
Wide-angle lens used as a reversed lens in front of a macro lens

Ordinary lenses can be used for macro photography by using a "reversing ring". This ring attaches to the filter thread on the front of a lens and converts the front thread to a conventional lens interface, which makes it possible to attach the lens in a reversed position on the camera body. Excellent quality results up to 4× life-size magnification are possible. For cameras with all-electronic communications between the lens and the camera body specialty reversing rings are available which preserve these communications. When used with extension tubes or bellows, a highly versatile, true macro (greater than life size) system can be assembled. Since non-macro lenses are optimized for small reproduction ratios, reversing the lens allows it to be used for reciprocally high ratios.

Macro photography may also be accomplished by mounting a lens in reverse, in front of a normally mounted lens of greater focal length, using a macro coupler which screws into the front filter threads of both lenses. This method allows most cameras to maintain the full function of electronic and mechanical communication with the normally mounted lens, for features such as open-aperture metering. In effect, the reversed lens is serving as an auxiliary close-up lens.

The approximate magnification of the combined lenses is calculated by dividing the focal length of the normally mounted host lens by the focal length of the reversed lens; for example, when an 18 mm lens is reverse mounted on a 300 mm lens, the resulting reproduction ratio is 300/18 or 16.7:1; the effective diopter of the reversed 18 mm lens is +55.6. The use of automatic focus is not advisable if the first lens is not of the internal-focusing type, as the extra weight of the reverse-mounted lens could damage the autofocus mechanism. Working distance is significantly less than the first lens.

=== Compact cameras and smartphones ===
Increasingly, macro photography is performed with compact digital cameras and small-sensor bridge cameras, combined with a high powered zoom lens and (optionally) a close-up diopter lens added to the front of the camera lens. The deep depth of field of these cameras is an advantage for macro work. Contemporary small-sensor digital cameras are equipped with high pixel density sensors and possess good resolving power due to advances in sensor technology, which enable them to capture very high levels of detail, rivaling the macro capabilities of a DSLR with a "true" macro lens, albeit often at the cost of greater image noise. Although the lenses fitted many small-sensor cameras have a lower reproduction ratio than a true macro lens (1:1), smaller sensors do not require the same optical reproduction ratio to produce identical framing and equivalent magnification, making macro photography more widely accessible at a lower cost.

In the digital age, a photograph is more practically defined as macro when an object measuring 24 mm or less either matches the frame's height or is larger.

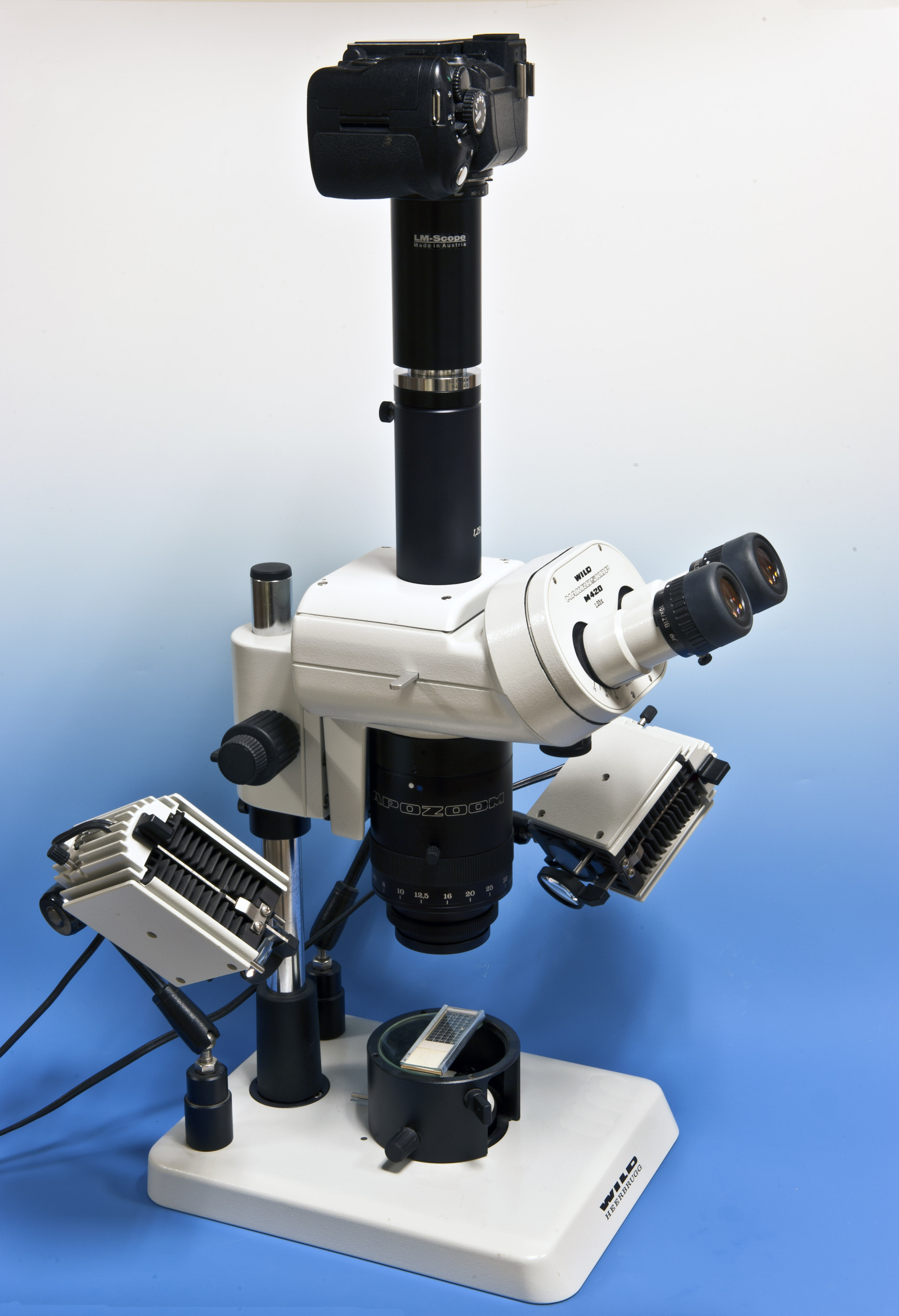
Wild Macroscope with digital SLR on an optical tube separate from the stereo binocular viewer

=== Microscope attachments ===
Macro photography can also be carried out by attaching a camera to one optical path of a binocular microscope (stereo microscope), making use of the optics of that instrument as the imaging lens for the system. Between approximately 1976 and 1993, the manufacturers Wild Heerbrugg (Switzerland) and subsequently, Leica Microsystems offered a dedicated microscopy system for macro photography, the macroscope line, with improved optical performance for photography at the expense of the stereo imaging facility of the stereo microscope; this system came with a range of dedicated stands, objective and supplementary lenses, and illumination systems. Following its discontinuation in 1993, Leica continues to offer similar products under the names Z6 APO and Z16 APO.

Macro photograph examples

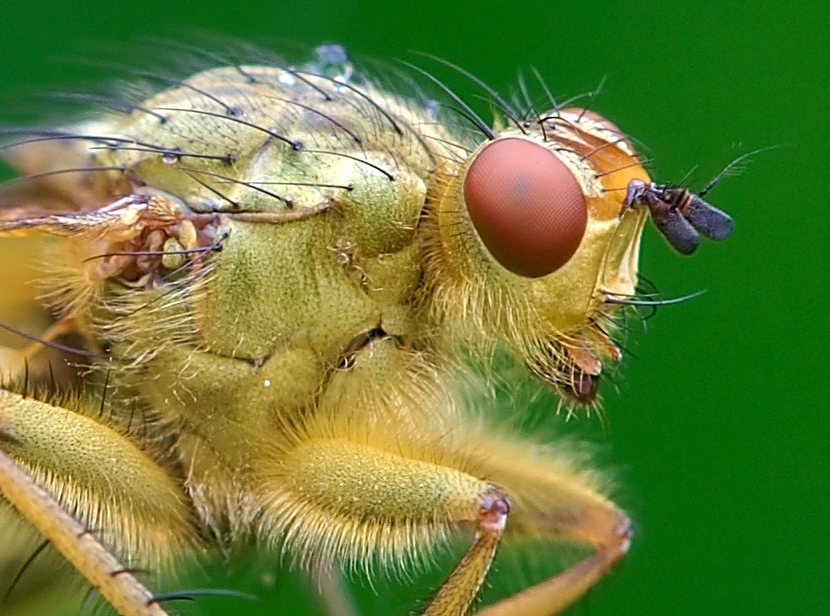
Common yellow dung fly (Scathophaga stercoraria) made using a lens at its maximum 1:1 reproduction ratio, and an 18×24mm image sensor, the on-screen display of the photograph results in a greater than life-size image

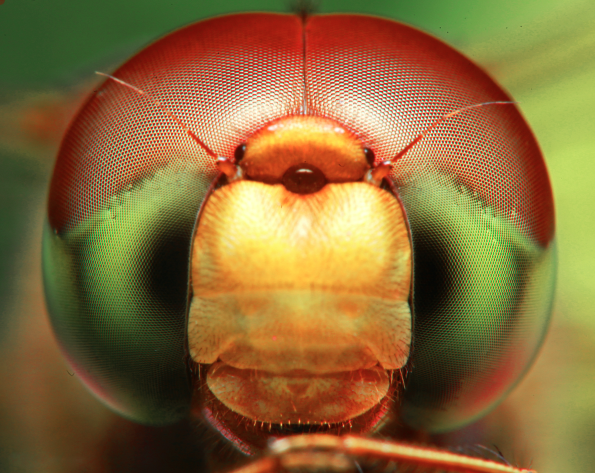
Headshot of a dragonfly taken with a 100 mm macro lens coupled with a 50 mm lens in reverse at the end

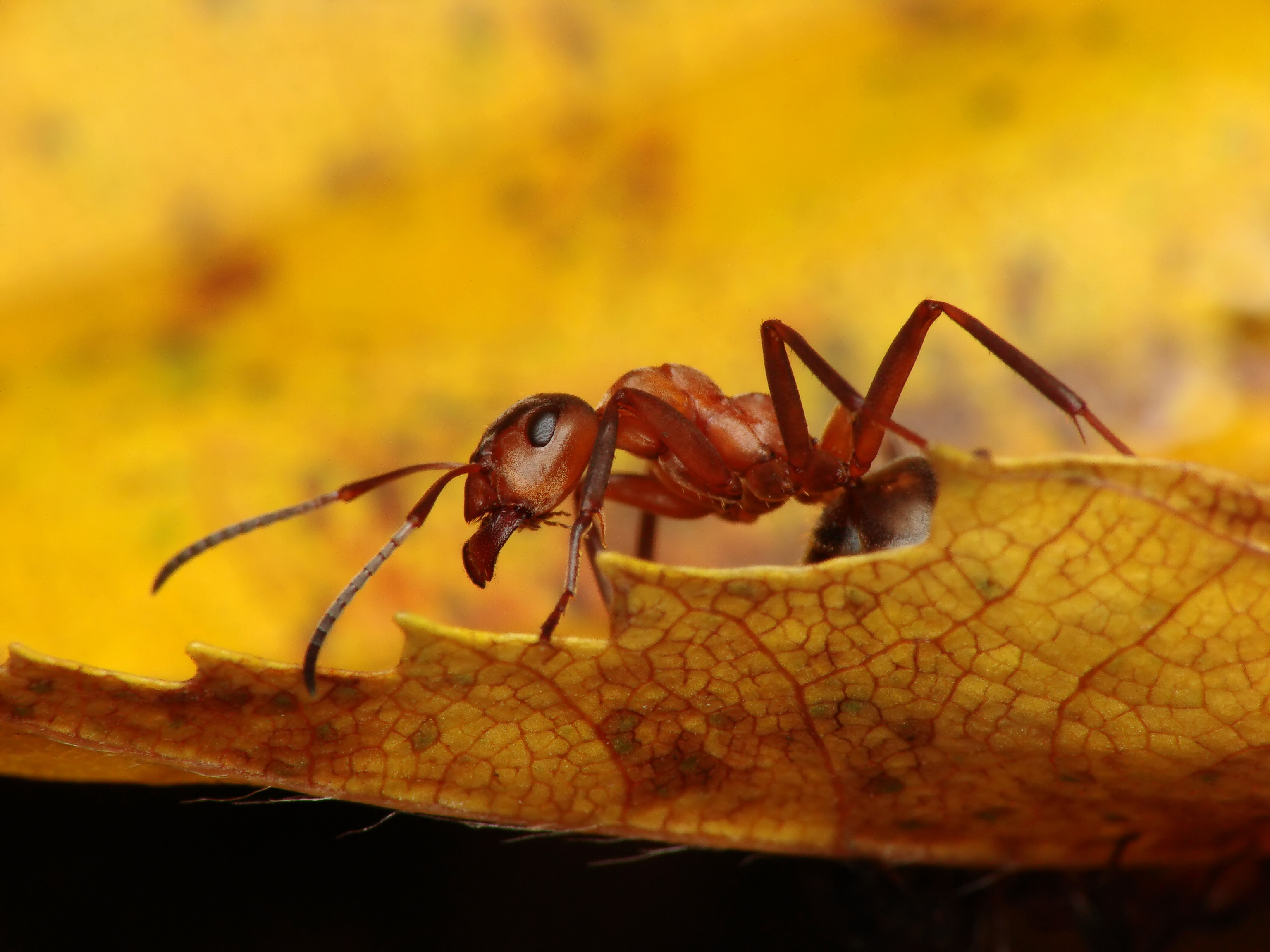
Ant

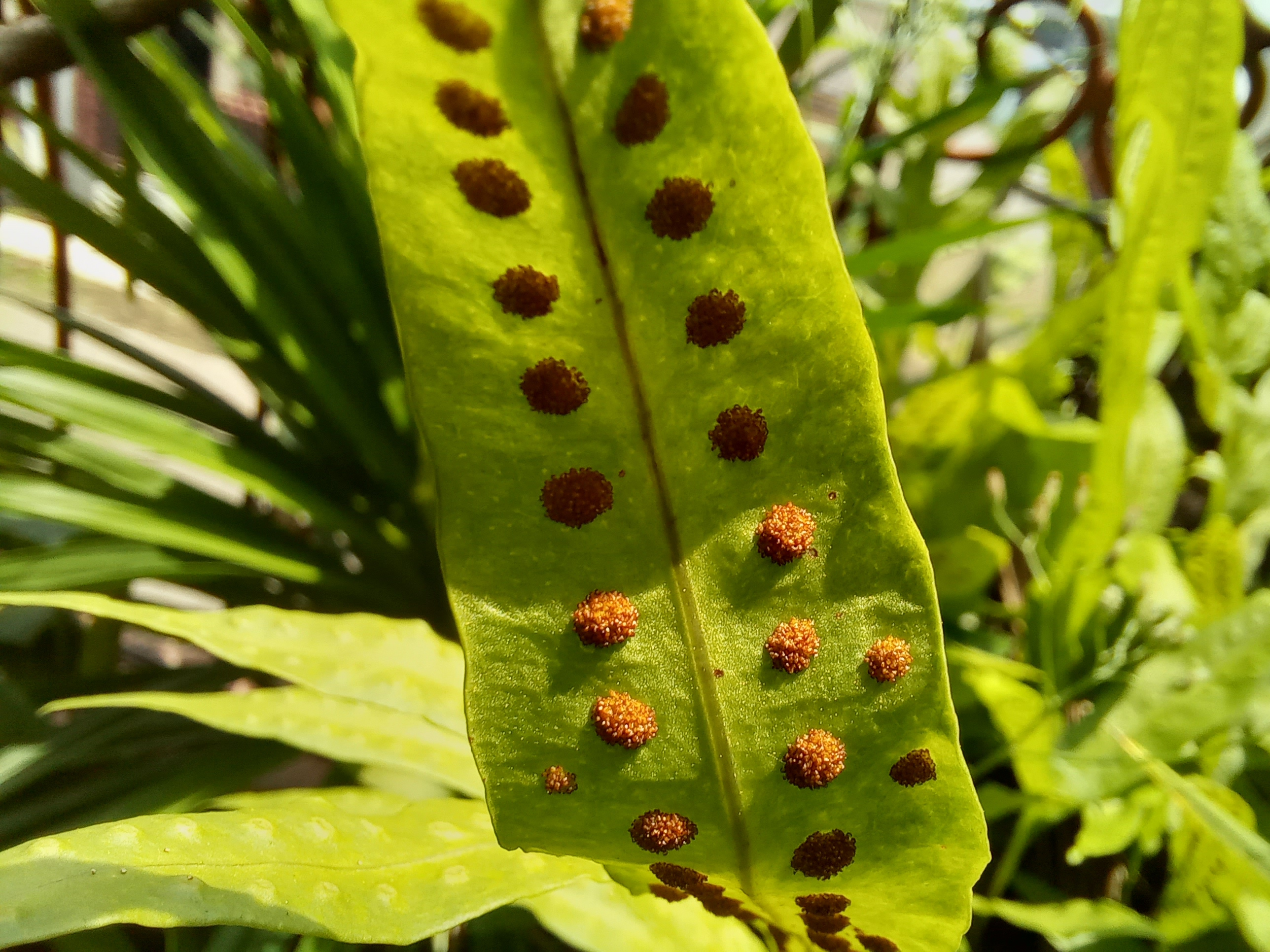
A fern sorus using 4:3 aspect ratio

== 35 mm equivalent magnification ==
35 mm equivalent magnification or reproduction ratio is a measure that indicates the apparent magnification achieved with a sensor format smaller than the 35mm film frame size of 24×36 mm (0.94×1.42 in). The term is useful because many photographers are familiar with the 35 mm film format.

Because an image captured by smaller sensor needs additional magnification to achieve the same display size, an equivalent reproduction ratio can be achieved on a smaller sensor using a lens with a smaller reproduction ratio. Consider a situation where the photographer captures an object measuring 18×12mm at life size (reproduction ratio of 1:1) with a 35mm or "full-frame" camera, resulting in a recorded image with subject measuring 18×12mm (1:1), which occupies 1/4 of the frame area (36×24mm). An equivalent photograph using a 4/3" sensor also would record the object into an area occupying 1/4 of the frame, assuming the picture will be displayed at the same size. Since the frame size of the smaller sensor is approximately 18×13.5mm, the object would be captured at 9×6mm, which means the required reproduction ratio with the smaller sensor is 1:2, not 1:1.

For example, the 12 megapixel Micro Four Thirds Panasonic Lumix DMC-GH1 camera with a 2× crop sensor only requires a 1:2 reproduction ratio to take a picture with the same subject size, resolution, and apparent magnification as a 12 megapixel "full-frame" Nikon D700 camera, when the images are viewed on screen or printed at the same size. Thus a Micro Four Thirds macro lens such as the Laowa 50mm f/2.8 2X Ultra Macro APO, with a maximum magnification of 2.0×, gives a 35 mm equivalent magnification of 4.0×.

To calculate 35 mm equivalent reproduction ratio, simply multiply the actual maximum magnification of the lens by the 35 mm conversion factor, or "crop factor" of the camera. If the actual magnification and/or crop factor are unknown (such as is the case with many compact or point-and-shoot digital cameras), simply take a photograph of a mm ruler placed vertically in the frame focused at the maximum magnification distance of the lens and measure the height of the frame. Since the object height of a 1.0x magnified 35 mm film image is 24 mm, calculate 35 mm equivalent reproduction ratio and true reproduction ratio by using the following:

(35 mm equivalent reproduction ratio) = 24 / (measured height in mm)

(True reproduction ratio) = (35 mm equivalent reproduction ratio) / Crop factor.

Since digital compact camera sensor sizes come in a variety of sizes and camera manufacturers rarely publish the macro reproduction ratios for these cameras, a rule of thumb is that whenever a 24 mm vertical object just fits, or is too tall to fit in the camera viewfinder, the resulting photograph can be considered a macro photograph.

Examples of equivalent reproduction ratios

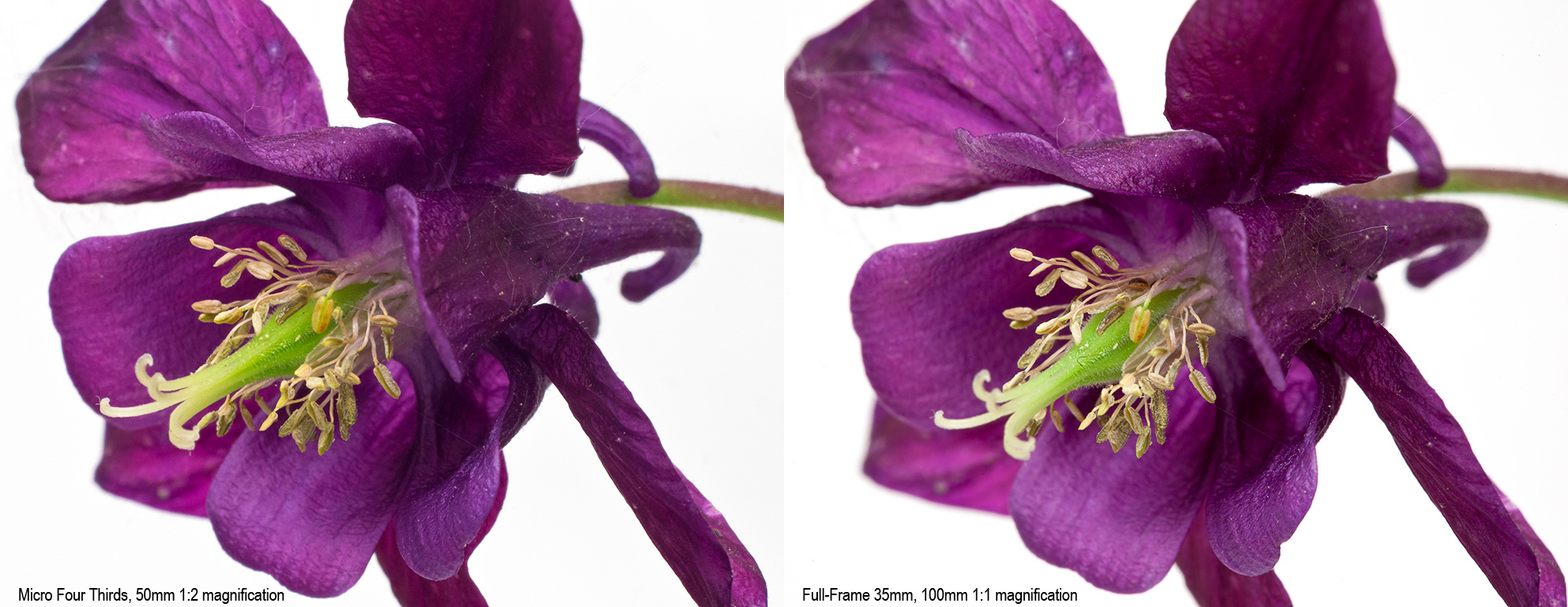
L: taken with a Micro Four Thirds (2× crop) sensor camera and a 50 mm macro lens at 1:2 magnification; R: taken with a full-frame (35 mm) sensor digital SLR camera and a 100 mm macro lens at 1:1 magnification.

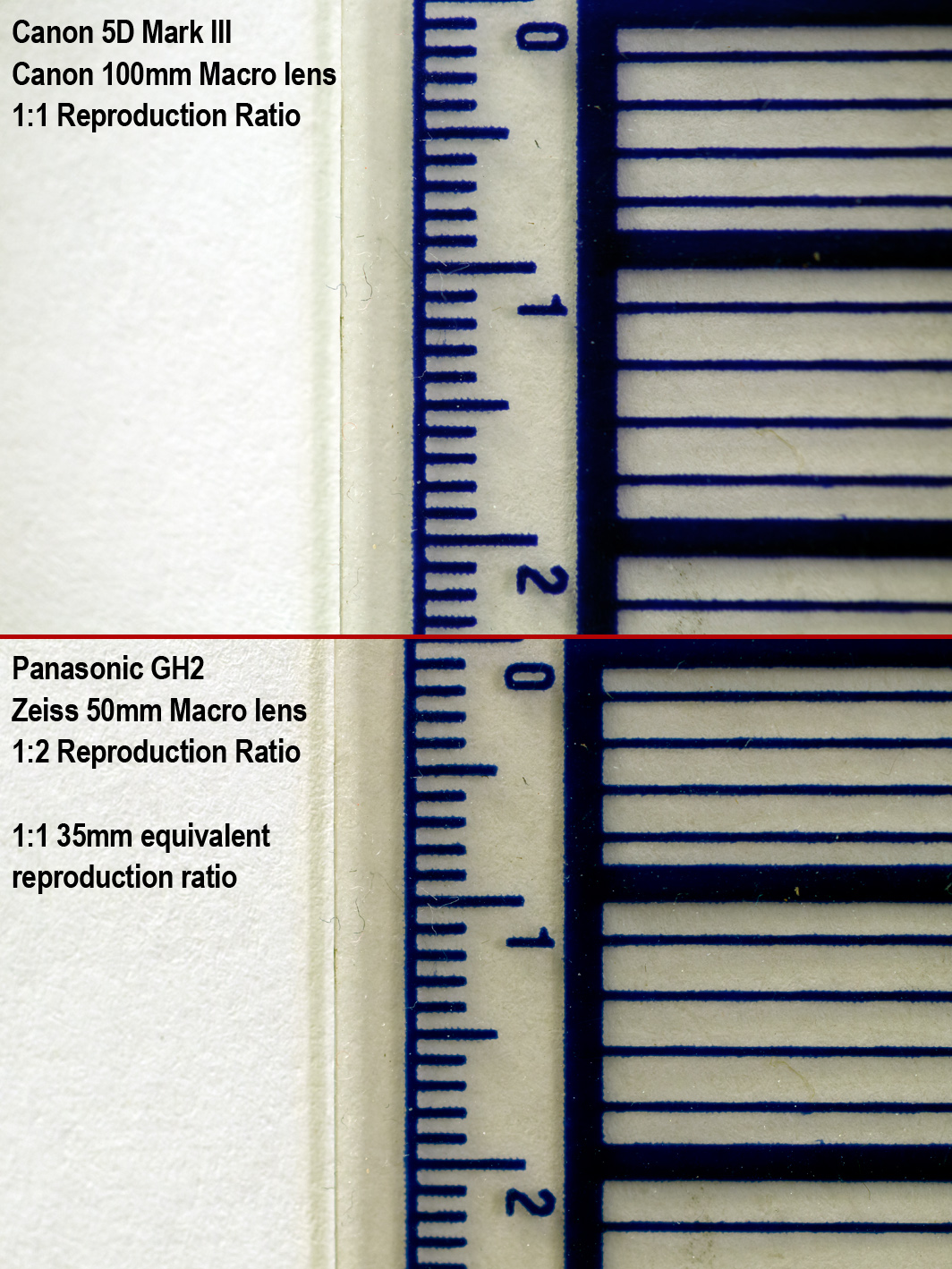
Top: taken with a full-frame (35 mm) sensor digital SLR camera and a 100 mm macro lens at 1:1 magnification; Bottom: taken with a Micro Four Thirds (2× crop) sensor camera and a 50 mm macro lens at 1:2 magnification.

== Technical considerations ==
=== Depth of field ===
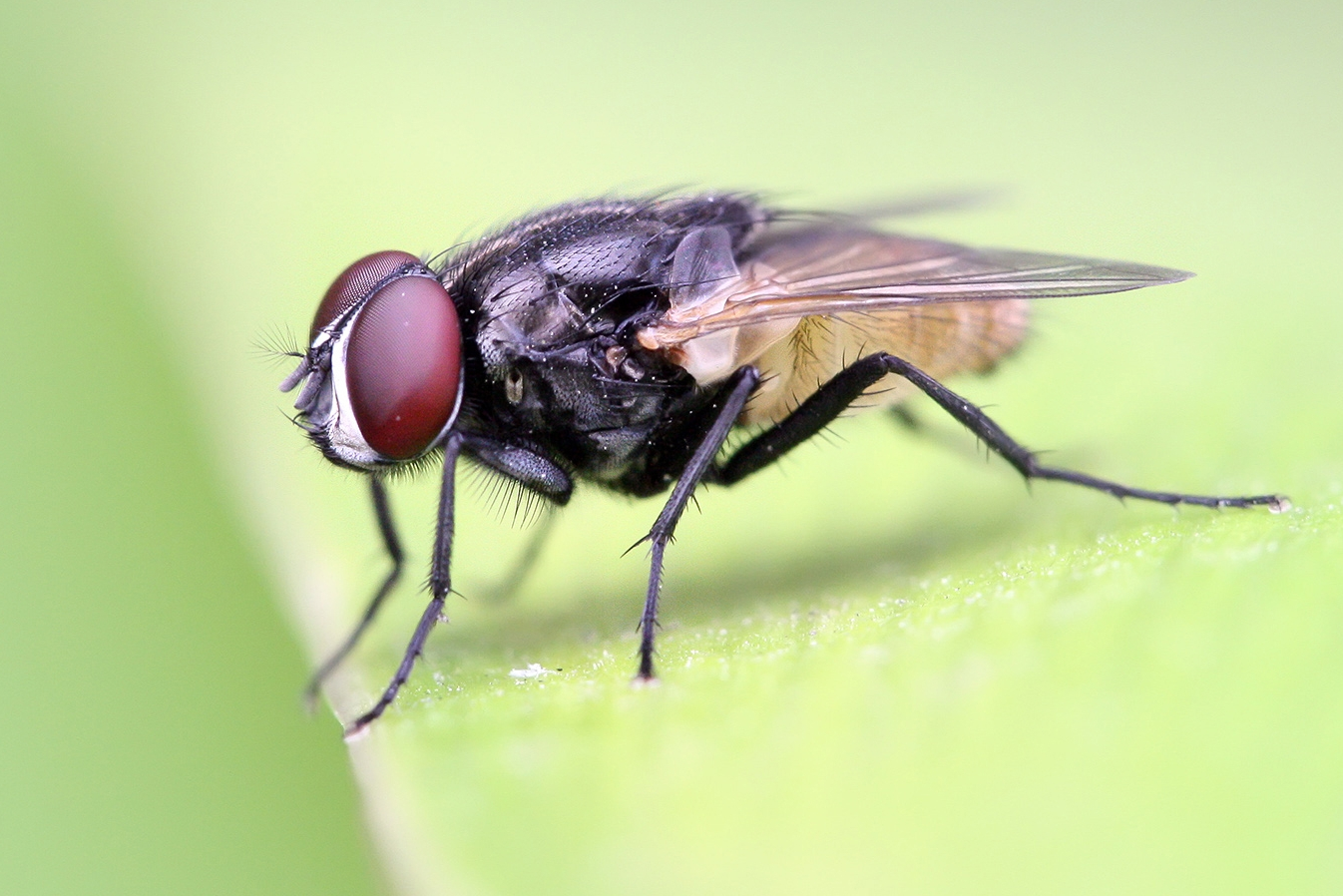
Housefly on a leaf photographed with a shallow depth of field, noticeable in the blurring in the foreground and the fly's right wing

Limited depth of field is an important consideration in macro photography. Depth of field is extremely small when focusing on close objects. A small aperture (high f-number) is often required to produce acceptable sharpness across a three-dimensional subject. This requires either a slow shutter speed, brilliant lighting, or a high ISO. Auxiliary lighting (such as from a flash unit), preferably a ring flash is often used (see Lighting section).

Like conventional lenses, macro lenses need light, and ideally would provide a similar f/# to conventional lenses to provide similar exposure times. Macro lenses also have similar focal lengths, so the entrance pupil diameter is comparable to that of conventional lenses (e.g., a 100 mm f/2.8 lens has a 100 mm/2.8 = 35.7 mm entrance-pupil diameter). Because they focus at close subjects, the cone of light from a subject point to the entrance pupil is relatively obtuse (a relatively high subject numerical aperture, to use a microscopy term), making the depth of field extraordinarily small. This makes it essential to focus critically on the most important part of the subject, as elements that are even a millimetre closer or farther from the focal plane might be noticeably blurred. Due to this, the use of a microscope stage is recommended for precise focus with large magnification, for example when photographing skin cells. Alternatively, more photographs of the same subject can be made with slightly different focusing lengths and joined afterwards with specialized focus stacking software which picks out the sharpest parts of every image, artificially increasing the perceived depth of field of the resulting image. For analog film cameras, light scanning photomicrography (LSP) has been used to overcome depth of field limitations. This technique uses a thin slit of light to illuminate an object as it is moved perpendicular through the plane of light to form the image. If the slit of light is narrower than the depth of field, the entire object will be recorded on film in focus.

=== Lighting ===
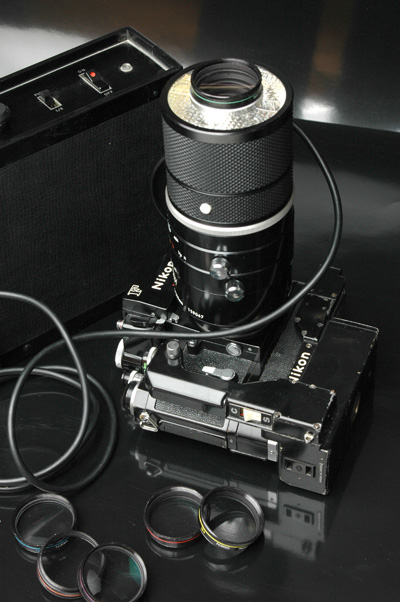
The Medical-Nikkor line of lenses have an integrated ringlight to provide even close-up illumination

The problem of sufficiently and evenly lighting the subject can be difficult. Some cameras can focus on subjects so close that they touch the front of the lens. It is difficult to place a light between the camera and a subject that close, making extreme close-up photography impractical. A normal-focal-length macro lens (50 mm on a 35 mm camera) can focus so close that lighting remains difficult. To avoid this problem, many photographers use telephoto macro lenses, typically with focal lengths from about 100 to 200 mm. These are popular as they permit sufficient distance for lighting between the camera and the subject.

Ring flashes, with flash tubes arranged in a circle around the front of the lens, can be helpful in lighting at close distances. Ring lights have emerged, using white LEDs to provide a continuous light source for macro photography, however they are not as bright as a ring flash and the white balance may be very cool.

Good results can also be obtained by using a flash diffuser. Homemade flash diffusers made out of white Styrofoam or plastic attached to a camera's built-in flash can also yield good results by diffusing and softening the light, eliminating specular reflections and providing more even lighting.

=== Exposure adjustment ===
Effective aperture for typical magnifications
RR	m	Effective f/	Open by n stops
1:10	1/10	×(1.1)	0.25
1:8	1/8	×(1.13)	0.25
1:5	1/5	×(1.2)	0.5
1:4	1/4	×(1.25)	0.75
1:3	1/3	×(1.33)	0.75
1:2	1/2	×(1.5)	1.25
1:1.5	2/3	×(1.67)	1.5
1:1	1/1	×(2)	2
2:1	2	×(3)	3.25
4:1	4	×(5)	4.75
5:1	5	×(6)	5.25

When the close-focus ability of the lens is achieved through mechanical extension alone, the exposure must be adjusted to compensate at close distances. If m is the magnification, the effective f-stop is determined by the formula:

$$f_{eff} = f \cdot (1+m)$$

For example, if the metered exposure calls for a shutter speed of 1/8 s and an aperture of f/2.8, when the lens has been extended to achieve a reproduction ratio of 1:3, the aperture should be set to f/2.1, resulting in an effective aperture of f/2.8. This is equivalent to opening the proper aperture setting of f/2.8 by approximately 0.75 f-stops. In general, the number of f-stops by which the aperture should be opened, n can be computed as:

$$n = \log_{2} (1+m)^2$$

Recent macro lens designs incorporate concepts from zoom lenses, and the focal length can change in conjunction with lens extension as the lens is focused closer, which complicates the exposure compensation calculation. Cameras equipped with through-the-lens light meters should adjust the exposure based on the focusing distance and the amount of light passed to the metering sensor(s), although this may require stopping the lens down.

=== Chromatic aberration ===
Many macro lenses are characterized by a high amount of chromatic aberration, especially when using reversed-lens, extension tube or close-up lenses. Some macro lenses, called apochromatic lenses, are designed to better control this, such as the Laowa 100mm f/2.8 2x Ultra Macro APO and the Sigma APO MACRO 150mm F2.8.

=== Working distance ===
Working distance refers to the space between the front of the lens and the subject. This depends on the focal length of the lens and the magnification achieved.

== See also ==
- Forensic photography – Art of producing an accurate reproduction of a crime scene
- Macroscope (Wild-Leica) – Optical microscope
- Micrograph – Process for producing pictures with a microscope
- Time-lapse photography – Filming technique
- Underwater photography – Genre of photography
