= Digital Earth =

Concept by Al Gore

Digital Earth is the name given to a concept by former US vice president Al Gore in 1998, describing a virtual representation of the Earth that is georeferenced and connected to the world's digital knowledge archives.

== Concept ==
=== Original vision ===
In a speech prepared for the California Science Center in Los Angeles on January 31, 1998, Gore described a digital future where schoolchildren - indeed all the world's citizens - could interact with a computer-generated three-dimensional spinning virtual globe and access vast amounts of scientific and cultural information to help them understand the Earth and its human activities. The greater part of this knowledge store would be free to all via the Internet, however a commercial marketplace of related products and services was envisioned to co-exist, in part in order to support the expensive infrastructure such a system would require. The origin of the idea can be traced back to 1960's Geoscope, a large spherical display to represent geographic phenomena, and the Terravision digital implementation of this idea in 1993.

Many aspects of his proposal have been realized - for instance, virtual globe geo-browsers such as NASA World Wind, Google Earth and Microsoft's Bing Maps 3D for commercial, social and scientific applications. But the Gore speech outlined a truly global, collaborative linking of systems that has yet to happen. That vision has been continually interpreted and defined by the growing global community of interest described below. The Digital Earth imagined in the speech has been defined as an "organizing vision" to steer scientists and technologists towards a shared goal, promising substantial advances in many scientific and engineering areas, similar to the Information superhighway.

=== An emerging view ===
Two noteworthy excerpts from the Beijing Declaration on Digital Earth, ratified September 12, 2009 at the 6th International Symposium on Digital Earth in Beijing:

"Digital Earth is an integral part of other advanced technologies including: earth observation, geo-information systems, global positioning systems, communication networks, sensor webs, electromagnetic identifiers, virtual reality, grid computation, etc. It is seen as a global strategic contributor to scientific and technological developments, and will be a catalyst in finding solutions to international scientific and societal issues."

"Digital Earth should play a strategic and sustainable role in addressing such challenges to human society as natural resource depletion, food and water insecurity, energy shortages, environmental degradation, natural disasters response, population explosion, and, in particular, global climate change."

=== Next-generation digital Earth ===
A group of international geographic and environmental scientists from government, industry, and academia brought together by the Vespucci Initiative for the Advancement of Geographic Information Science, and the Joint Research Centre of the European Commission recently published "Next-Generation Digital Earth" a position paper that suggests its eight key elements:

1. Not one Digital Earth, but multiple connected globes/infrastructures addressing the needs of different audiences: citizens, communities, policymakers, scientists, educationalists.
2. Problem oriented: e.g. environment, health, societal benefit areas, and transparent on the impacts of technologies on the environment
3. Allowing search through time and space to find similar/analogue situations with real time data from both sensors and humans (different from what existing GIS can do, and different from adding analytical functions to a virtual globe)
4. Asking questions about change, identification of anomalies in space in both human and environmental domains (flag things that are not consistent with their surroundings in real time)
5. Enabling access to data, information, services, and models as well as scenarios and forecasts: from simple queries to complex analyses across the environmental and social domains.
6. Supporting the visualization of abstract concepts and data types (e.g. low income, poor health, and semantics)
7. Based on open access, and participation across multiple technological platforms, and media (e.g. text, voice and multi-media)
8. Engaging, interactive, exploratory, and a laboratory for learning and for multidisciplinary education and science.

== Key developments ==
Significant progress towards Digital Earth has been achieved over the last decade as collected in a survey paper by Mahdavi-Amiri et al., including work in these categories:

=== Spatial Data Infrastructure (SDI) ===
The number of Spatial Data Infrastructures has grown steadily since the early 1990s, aided in part by interoperability standards maintained by the Open Geospatial Consortium and the International Organization for Standardization (ISO). Significant recent efforts to link and coordinate SDI's include Infrastructure for Spatial Information in Europe (INSPIRE) and the UNSDI Initiative of the UN Geographic Information Working Group (UNIGWG). Between 1998 and 2001, the NASA-chaired Interagency Digital Earth Working Group (IDEW) contributed to this growth with a particular focus on interoperability issues, giving rise to the Web Map Service standard among others.

=== Geobrowsers ===
The scientific use of geo-browser virtual globes such as Google Earth, NASA's World Wind, and ESRI's ArcGIS Explorer has grown significantly as their functionality has improved and with the KML format having become the de facto standard for globe visualizations. Numerous examples can be viewed at the Google Earth Outreach Showcase and at the World Wind Java Demo Applications and Applets.

=== Sensor networks ===
Geosensors are defined as "...any device receiving and measuring environmental stimuli that can be geographically referenced." Large scale networks of geosensors have been in place for many years, measuring Earth surface, hydrological and atmospheric phenomena. The advent of the Internet led to a large expansion of such networks, and efforts like Global Earth Observation System of Systems (GEOSS) Initiative aim to connect them.

=== Volunteered Geographic Information (VGI) ===
The term Volunteered Geographic Information was coined in 2007 by geographer Michael Goodchild, referring to the rapidly growing volume of social and scientific georeferenced user-generated content being made available on the Web by both expert and non-expert individuals and groups. This phenomenon is seen as an emerging Geoweb that provides Application Programming Interfaces (API's) to software developers and increasingly user-friendly web mapping software to both scientists and the public at large.

=== International community ===
The International Journal of Digital Earth is a peer-reviewed research journal, launched in 2008, concerned with the science and technology of Digital Earth and its applications in all major disciplines.

The International Society for Digital Earth is a non-political, non-governmental and not-for-profit international organization, principally for promotion of academic exchange, science and technology innovation, education, and international collaboration.

Several International Symposia on Digital Earth (ISDE) have been held. There have been seven ISDE symposia and three Digital Earth Summits. Proceedings for many of them are available. The 7th Symposium was held in Perth, Western Australia in 2011. The 4th Digital Earth Summit was held in Wellington, New Zealand in September, 2012.

=== Digital Earth Reference Model (DERM) ===
The term Digital Earth Reference Model (DERM) was coined by Tim Foresman in context with a vision for an all encompassing geospatial platform as an abstract for information flow in support of Al Gore's vision for a Digital Earth. The Digital Earth reference model seeks to facilitate and promote the use of georeferenced information from multiple sources over the Internet. A digital Earth reference model defines a fixed global reference frame for the Earth using four principles of a digital system, namely:

1. Discrete partitioning using regular or irregular cell mesh, tiling or Grid;
2. Data acquisition using signal processing theory (sampling and quantizing) for assigning binary values from continuous analog or other digital sources to the discrete cell partitions;
3. An ordering or naming of cells that can provide both unique spatial indexing and geographic location address;
4. A set of mathematical operations built on the indexing for algebraic, geometric, Boolean and image processing transforms, etc.

The Open Geospatial Consortium has a spatial reference system standard based on the DERM called a Discrete Global Grid System (DGGS):

a DGGS is a spatial reference system that uses a hierarchical tessellation of cells to partition and address the globe. DGGS are characterized by the properties of their cell structure, geo-encoding, quantization strategy and associated mathematical functions. The OGC DGGS standard supports the specification of standardized DGGS infrastructures that enable the integrated analysis of very large, multi-source, multi-resolution, multi-dimensional, distributed geospatial data. Interoperability between OGC DGGS implementations is anticipated through extension interface encodings of OGC Web Services.

Thus, the DGGS is a discrete, hierarchical, information grid with an addressing (or indexing) scheme to assign unique addresses to each cell across the entire DGGS Domain.

== Background ==
=== United States ===
Technology developments that support the current Digital Earth technological framework can be traced to U.S. computing advances derived from the Cold War competition, the space race, and commercial innovations. Therefore, many innovations can be tracked to corporations working for the Department of Defense or NASA. However, the philosophical foundations for Digital Earth can be more closely aligned with the increased awareness of global changes and the need to better understand the concepts of sustainability for the planet's survival. These roots can be traced back to visionaries such as Buckminster Fuller who proposed development of a GeoScope half a century ago, analogous to a microscope to examine and improve our understanding of the planet Earth.

From Fall 1998 until Fall 2000, NASA led the U.S. Digital Earth initiative in cooperation with its sister government agencies, including the Federal Geospatial Data Committee (FGDC). Attention to consensus development of standards, protocols and tools through cooperative test-bed initiatives was the primary process for advancement of this initiative within the government community.

In 1999, NASA was selected to head a new Interagency Digital Earth Working Group (IDEW), due to its reputation for technology innovations and its focus on the study of planetary change. The new initiative was located in the NASA's Office of Earth Sciences. This titular focus was considered necessary to help align over 17 government agencies and keep sustainability and Earth oriented applications as a guiding principle for the Digital Earth enterprise. Components for development of 3-D Earth graphic-user-interfaces (GUIs) were placed into various technological sectors to stimulate cooperative development support. While initially limited to government personnel, industry and academia were early observers attending IDEW workshops to discuss topics such as, visualization, information fusion, standards and interoperability, advanced computational algorithms, digital libraries and museums. In March 2000, at a special IDEW meeting hosted by Oracle Corporation in Herndon, Virginia, industry representatives demonstrated several promising 3-D visualization prototypes. Within two years, these were captivating international audiences, including Kofi Annan and Colin Powell, in government, business, science, and mass media who began to purchase the early commercial geo-browsers. Just as the spectacular Apollo photography of Earthrise provided an inspiring Earth-centric image for new generations to appreciate the fragility of our biosphere, the 3-D Digital Earths began inspiring growing numbers of people to the possibility of better understanding and possibly saving our planet. Introduction of satellite data into commercially accessible spatial toolboxes significantly advanced the capacity to map, monitor, and manage our planet's resources and provide a unifying perspective on the Digital Earth vision.

After Al Gore lost the 2000 presidential election, the incoming administration considered the programmatic moniker Digital Earth a political liability. Digital Earth was relegated to a minority status within the FGDC, used primarily to define 3-D visualization reference models.

=== China ===
In 1999, with the Chinese government's full backing, the inaugural International Symposium on Digital Earth in Beijing provided a venue for the extensive international support for implementing the Gore Digital Earth vision introduced a year earlier. Hundreds of digital earth cities created by governments and universities resulted. In China, Digital Earth became a metaphor for modernization and automation with computers, leading to its incorporation into a five-year modernization plan. Originating from China's satellite remote sensing community, Digital Earth prowess spread to a range of applications including flood predictions, dust cloud modeling, environmental assessments, and city planning. China has been omnipresent at all international Digital Earth conferences since and has recently founded the International Society for Digital Earth, one of the first NGOs created by the Chinese Academy of Sciences. In 2009, the International Symposium on Digital Earth returned to Beijing for its 6th meeting.

=== United Nations ===
In 2000, the United Nations Environment Programme (UNEP) advanced the Digital Earth to enhance decision-makers' access to information for then Secretary-General Kofi Annan and the United Nations Security Council. UNEP promoted use of web-based geospatial technologies with the ability to access the world's environmental information, in association with economic and social policy issues. A reorganization of UNEP's data and information resources was initiated in 2001, based on the GSDI/DE architecture for a network of distributed and interoperable databases creating a framework of linked servers. The design concept was based upon using a growing network of internet mapping software and database content with advanced capabilities to link GIS tools and applications. UNEP.net, launched in February 2001, provided UN staff with an unparalleled facility for accessing authoritative environmental data resources and a visible example to others in the UN community. However, a universal user interface for UNEP.net, suitable for members of Security Council, that is non-scientists, did not exist. UNEP began actively testing prototypes for a UNEP geo-browser beginning in mid-2001 with a showcase for the African community displayed at the 5th African GIS Conference in Nairobi, Kenya November 2001. Keyhole Technology, Inc. (later purchased in 2004 by Google and to become Google Earth) was contracted to develop and demonstrate the first full globe 3-D interactive Digital Earth using web-stream data from a distributed database located on servers around the planet. A concerted effort within the UN community, via the Geographic Information Working Group (UNGIWG), followed immediately, including purchase of early Keyhole systems by 2002. UNEP provided further public demonstrations for this early Digital Earth system at the World Summit on Sustainable Development in September, 2002 at Johannesburg, South Africa. In seeking an engineering approach to system-wide development of the Digital Earth model, recommendations were made at the 3rd UNGIWG Meeting, June 2002, Washington, D.C. for creating a document on the Functional User Requirements for geo-browsers. This proposal was communicated to the ISDE Secretariat in Beijing and the organizing committee for the 3rd International Symposium on Digital Earth and agreement was reached by the Chinese Academy of Sciences-sponsored Secretariat to host the first of the two Digital Earth geo-browser meetings.

=== Japan ===
Japan, led by Keio University and JAXA, has also played a prominent international role in Digital Earth helping to create the Digital Asia Network with a secretariat located in Bangkok to promote regional cooperation and initiatives. Citizens in the Gifu Prefecture upload information to community-scale Digital Earth programs with from their smartphones on topics ranging from first sightings of fireflies in spring to location of blocked handicap access ramps.

== Events ==
Event	Year	Location	Theme
ISDE 1	1999	Beijing, China	Moving towards Digital Earth
ISDE 2	2001	New Brunswick, Canada	Beyond Information Infrastructure
ISDE 3	2003	Brno, Czech Republic	Information Resources for Global Sustainability
ISDE 4	2005	Tokyo, Japan	Digital Earth as a Global Commons
Digital Earth Summit '06	2006	Auckland, New Zealand	Information Resources for Global Sustainability
ISDE 5	2007	Berkeley & San Francisco, USA	Bringing Digital Earth down to Earth
Digital Earth Summit '08	2008	Potsdam, Germany	Geoinformatics: Tools for Global Change Research
ISDE 6	2009	Beijing, China	Digital Earth in Action
ISDE 7	2011	Perth, Western Australia	ISDE7 The Knowledge Generation
Digital Earth Summit '12	2012	Wellington, New Zealand	

== See also ==
- Destination Earth (European Union)
- Digital twin
- Geocode
- Geodesic grid
- Géoportail
- Geoweb
- Grid reference
- International Cartographic Association (ICA)
- International Society for Digital Earth (ISDE)
- Spatial index
