= Destination Earth (European Union) =

Destination Earth also known as DestinE, is an initiative from the European Commission of Ursula von der Leyen. It aims to create a digital simulation of Earth with a digital twin that will be used to better understand the effects of climate change and environmental disasters and to permit policymakers more effectively respond to these issues.

== Background ==
The project Destination Earth embodies the wider scope of the von der Leyen Commission. The project inscribes itself in the two-key priorities of the Commission which are the digital transition and climate transition, aiming together to achieve carbon neutrality by 2050. Integrated to the Digital Europe Programme and the European Green Deal, Destination Earth aims to create a digital simulation of Earth with a digital twin of our planet, meaning an exact digital reproduction of the Earth. It will use an unprecedented amount of real-time data from climate, meteorological, behavioral, and atmospheric sensors to develop this high-precision model of our planet.

== Relevance of the project ==
This very precise digital model of the Earth would enable different user groups such as public groups and the scientific and private communities to monitor and simulate natural and human activity, and to develop test scenarios in order to better predict the effects of climate change. With the current climate change challenge, this initiative is very relevant. Using DestinE modeling, the European Commission, as part of the European Green Deal, but also states will be able to evaluate the impact and efficiency of environmental legislative proposals.

== Chronology ==
- November 2019: the first stakeholder workshop on DestinE was held. It brings together a variety of potentially interested parties from the public authorities and the industrial and scientific communities.
- October 2020: the Connect organised two workshops on "Weather-induced and Geophysical Extremes" (21 October) and "Climate Change Adaptation" (22 October) with experts from scientific communities which led to series of recommendations.

In consultation with institutions such as the European Space Agency, the European Centre for Medium-Range Weather Forecasts, the European Organisation for the Exploitation of Meteorological Satellites and the services and agencies of the European Commission, The Joint Research Centre released its study entitled "Destination Earth - Use Case Analysis". It gives a state-of-the-art requirements analysis for the development and creation of digital twins. It also gives the technical architecture necessary and the first mapping of already existing developments in Europe in the field of digital twins.

- January 2021: Destination Earth was officially launched.

== Implementation ==
DestinE has been launched on 1 January 2021 and will be gradually implemented over the next 7 to 10 years. The operational platform of the modeling "digital twins and services" will be developed by the European Commission under the Digital Europe program. Financially, it is Horizon Europe, the European Union's research and innovation "framework program" that has taken effect on 1 January 2021, that is founding the research and innovation for the further development of DestinE. DestinE may also associate with other EU programs such as the new Space Programme which will support the European space industry. Other possible synergies with national initiatives will be explored.

== Key steps of DestinE ==
In more details, Destination Earth is expected to follow three scheduled stages

- By 2023: the operational platform is expected to be launched. It will be the first two digital twins. The EU is likely to succeed in this objective. As Josef Aschbacher – next director of the European Space Agency from 1 March 2021 – told Bloomberg on 17 January 2021 the Destination Earth initiative will indeed be able to produce its first digital-twin models before the end of the decade.
- By 2025: the platform will integrate 4 to 5 operational digital twins. At that date, the platform is expected to be open to the public sector in order for them to be able to develop, monitor, and assess the impact on the environment and climate of policy and legislative measures.
- By 2025-30: Development towards a full digital twin of the Earth through a convergence of the digital twins already offered through the platform.
