= Macroscope (Wild-Leica) =

Optical microscope

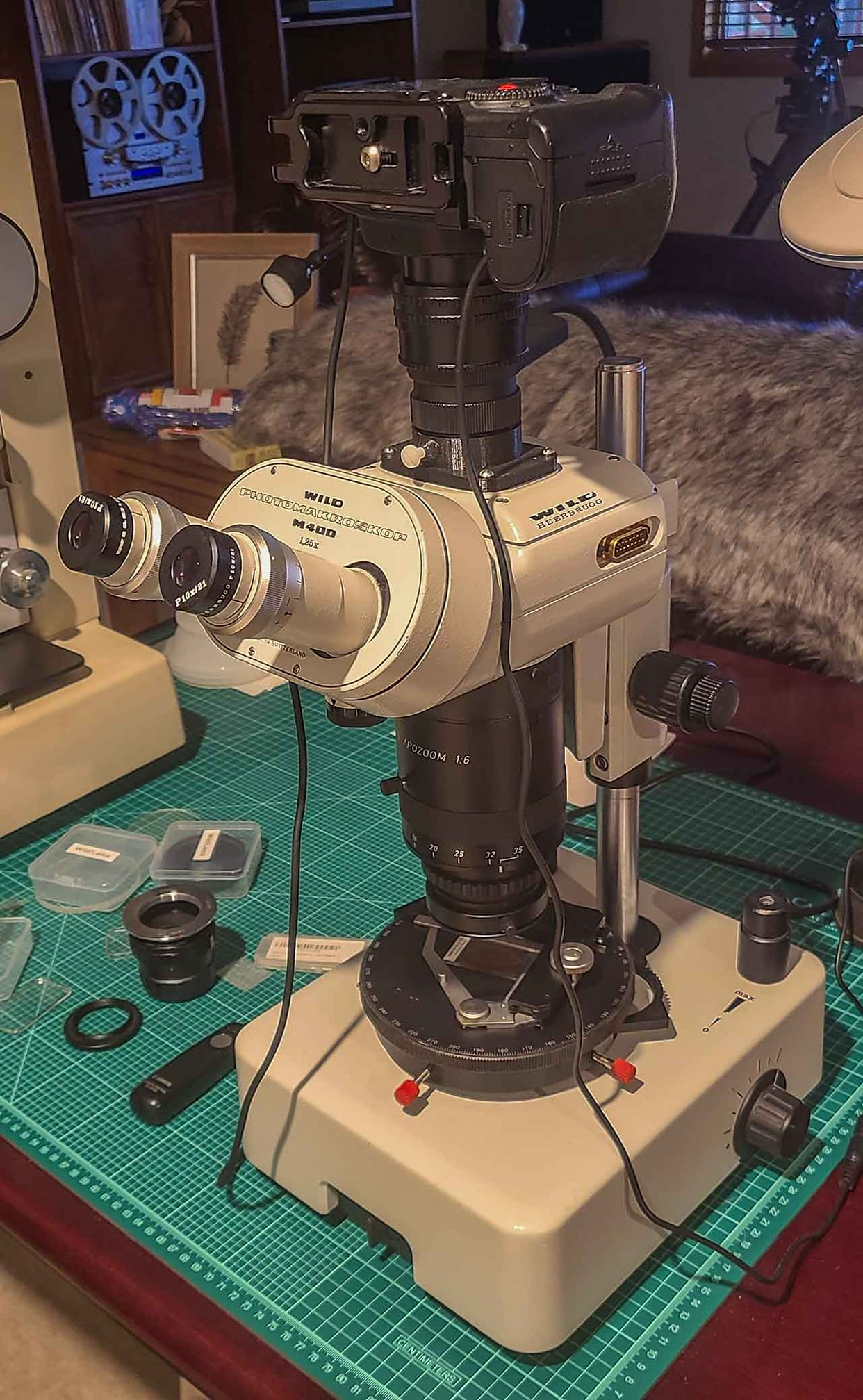
A Wild M400 macroscope

A macroscope or photomacroscope in its camera-equipped version (in German: makroskop / photomakroskop) is a type of optical microscope developed and named by Swiss microscope manufacturers Wild Heerbrugg and later, after that company's merger with Leica in 1987, by Leica Microsystems of Germany, optimised for high quality macro photography and/or viewing using a single objective lens and light path, rather than stereoscopic viewing of specimens, at magnifications up to around x40 (which can be increased further with optional supplementary lenses or higher power eyepieces). The Wild, subsequently Leica "macroscope" line was in production from approximately 1976–2003; it was succeeded by the Leica Z6 and Z16 offerings, which continued an equivalent (optically improved) functionality, but without the "macroscope" designation. The macroscope remains a useful, if somewhat specialised, instrument for examination of relevant specimens in various laboratories today.

== Description ==
The macroscope outwardly resembles a binocular microscope (stereo microscope) but has a single light path in place of the dual light paths of the latter, which is relayed as an identical image to both eyepieces, and optionally, a camera port. In the Wild era it was offered as the M400, M410, M420 and M450 instruments, subsequently sold as the Leica M420 only. Optimised for macro photography in particular (since the camera path passed through the centre of the imaging lens, thereby offering the best optical performance), the instrument was not intended for mass sale but for specialised technical use, such as in universities and research laboratories, for example for production of images for use in scientific publications, or for inspection and production control for microscopic circuits, etc., in the semiconductor industry. In addition to their generally good optical performance, macroscopes offer a large, fixed working distance independent of magnification setting between the bottom of the objective lens and the subject, which is advantageous for manipulation of the specimens and/or introduction of supplementary lighting, etc. A further benefit of the macroscope principle (in contrast to the stereo microscope) is there is no parallax error (apparent lateral shift of the specimen) when acquiring "z-stacks" or focus stacked images for subsequent merging.

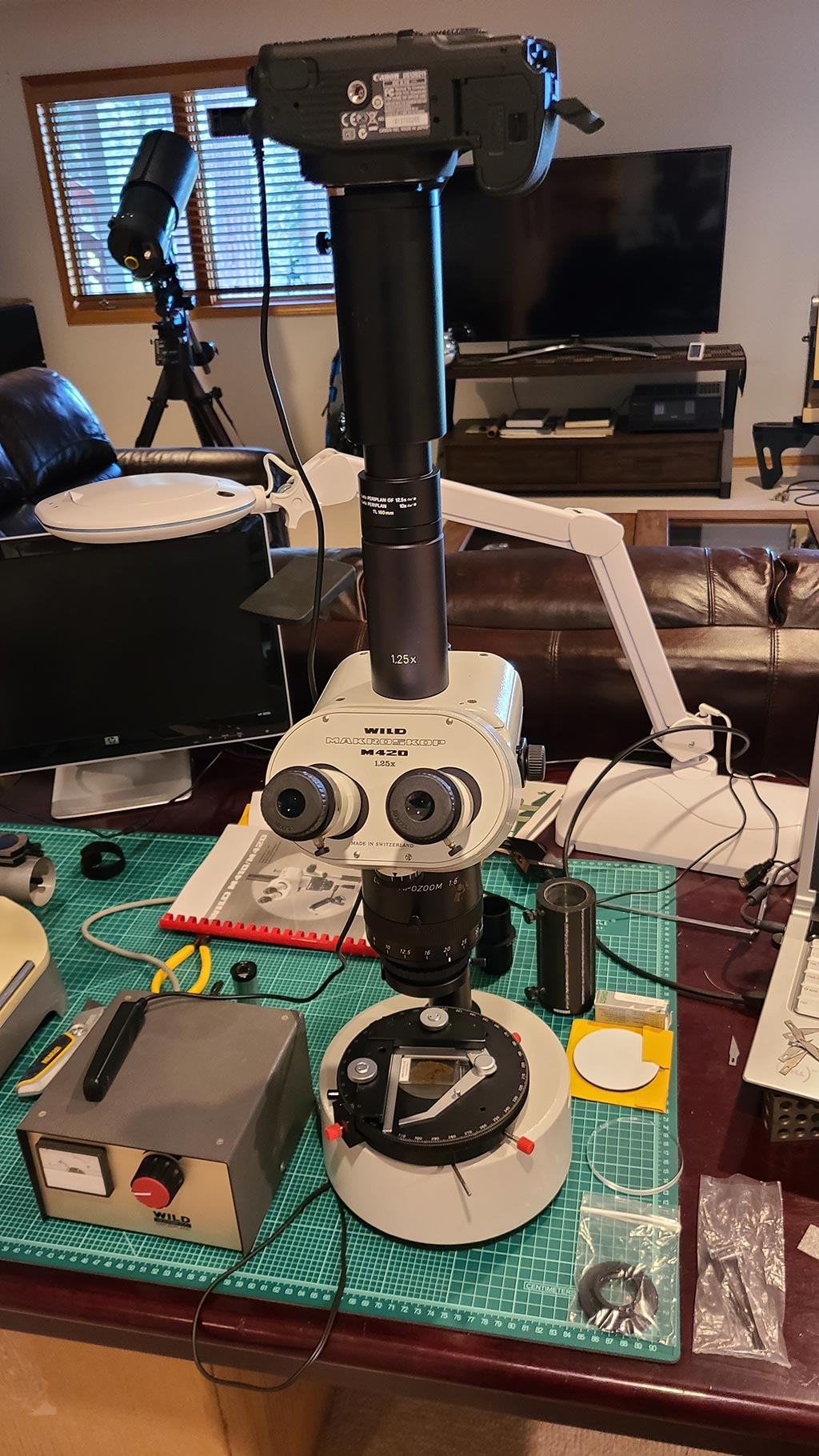
A Wild M420 macroscope

== Model features and history ==
The Wild M400 and M450 were introduced in 1976, the M450 being essentially an M400 without the dedicated photo tube (thus intended for observation only). The M400 was sold with a dedicated range of camera bodies controlled by a large electronics box separate from the microscope, with some of the camera elements (the exposure sensor and the shutter) incorporated into the microscope body, and was an expensive model to both make and purchase. Both it and the later M420 incorporated a manual aperture control (to control depth-of-field) and it was available with a "Macrozoom" objective with a magnification range of 6.3x to 32x, i.e., an approximate zoom ratio of 1:5. Supplementary lenses were available which modified the objective magnification by 0.5x, 1.5x or 2x. There also was a version of the M450 marketed as the EpiMakroScop, which had the "Epizoom" objective, essentially a Macrozoom with a permanently attached 2x front element, thus twice the magnification but only half of the potential field-of-view of its "standard" equivalent. The (later) M420 was a cheaper option than the M400, lacking the electronic controls and in-microscope photography-associated features, but allowing the user to mount a camera of their choice on the top; the M410 was its sister model, designed for observation only (no photo tube). After the M420 production was taken over by Leica, initial models were offered with the same Macrozoom objective, and later ones with a new "Apozoom" objective possessing a zoom range between 5.8x and 35x (1:6), designed to provide higher resolution and better colour correction. Final magnification in the image plane was calculated incorporating a 1.25x magnification in both the viewing and photo tubes, leading to (for example) a range of 7.875x to 40x for the Macrozoom-equipped system (quoted range using the 10x eyepieces), further variable via a choice of different eyepiece magnifications and/or the additional supplementary lenses that could be mounted on the objective.

== Successors ==
The original "macroscope" line was formally dropped in around 2003, in favour of a redesigned product range, the Leica Z6 APO (6.3x zoom range) and Z16 APO (16x zoom range); these follow similar design principles but no longer incorporate "macroscope" in their model names, although the word persists as a descriptive term in some product literature. A fluorescence-equipped version of these instruments is also marketed as the Leica MacroFluo.

== Similar/earlier instruments ==
The term "macroscope" was not actually invented by Wild Heerbrugg but appears to have been a generic term used earlier by some other optical manufacturers including Bausch and Lomb (for a small monocular device), and EdnaLite Research Corporation, whose "MacroScope" (also marketed as the "S/P (=Scientific Products) Macroscope system") included "four separate levels of magnification".
