= Madeline (video game series) =

French educational video game series

- Series logo
- Genres: Educational, adventure
- Developers: Vortex Media Arts; Presage Software
- Publishers: Creative Wonders; ABC/EA (1995–1997); The Learning Company (1998); Mattel Interactive (1999)
- Creators: Ludwig Bemelmans (franchise); Greg Bestick (video games)
- Artists: Laurie Bauman (original design); Annie Fox (original design)
- Platforms: Microsoft Windows, Mac OS
- First release: Madeline and the Magnificent Puppet Show: A Learning Journey: NA: November 15, 1995
- Latest release: Madeline 1st and 2nd Grade Math: NA: July 12, 1999
- Parent series: Madeline

Madeline is a series of educational point-and-click adventure video games which were developed during the mid-1990s for Windows and Mac systems. The games are an extension of the Madeline series of children's books by Ludwig Bemelmans, which describe the adventures of a young French girl. The video-game series was produced concurrently with a TV series of the same name, with characters and voice actors from the show.

In each game, Madeline guides the player through educational mini-games. Activities include reading comprehension, mathematics, problem-solving, basic French and Spanish vocabulary, and cultural studies. Each game focuses on a different subject. Although the series is set primarily in Madeline's boarding school in Paris (and its surrounding neighborhoods), some games are set in other European countries.

The series was conceived by Creative Wonders president Greg Bestick and developed by Vortex Media Arts. It aimed to provide educational material to preschool and early-elementary-grade girls with a recognizable, appealing character. Educators, parents, and children were consulted during the series' development. The first game, Madeline and the Magnificent Puppet Show: A Learning Journey, was released in the fall of 1995 to coincide with the premiere of The New Adventures of Madeline animated television series. The series has eight games and two compilations.

The games were published by Creative Wonders, The Learning Company (formerly SoftKey) and Mattel Interactive. They were developed in association with DIC Entertainment, which held the rights to the game and the TV series. Creative Wonders and the Learning Company conducted several promotional campaigns for the games. The series was commercially successful, with individual games frequently appearing on lists of best-selling games. It was generally well received by critics for its focus on education and its animation style. In 1998, Creative Wonders was purchased by The Learning Company (formerly SoftKey), and in 1999 the series was discontinued when Creative Wonders was dissolved and demand lessened for children's point and click games.

== Titles ==
Release timeline
1995	
1995	Madeline and the Magnificent Puppet Show: A Learning Journey
1996	
1996	Madeline Thinking Games
1996	Madeline European Adventures
1997	
1997	Madeline Classroom Companion: Preschool and Kindergarten
1997	Madeline Classroom Companion: 1st and 2nd Grade
1998	Madeline Thinking Games Deluxe
1998	Madeline Rainy Day Activities
1998	Madeline 1st and 2nd Grade Reading
1998	Madeline 1st & 2nd Grade Reading Deluxe
1999	
1999	Madeline 1st and 2nd Grade Math

Madeline and the Magnificent Puppet Show: A Learning Journey was the first game in the series. Its release was scheduled to promote the American ABC TV animated series, The New Adventures of Madeline. Set in Paris, the game follows Madeline as she organizes a puppet show to raise money to help her neighbor avoid eviction by his greedy landlord. In the second game, Madeline Thinking Games, Madeline invites the player to explore the rooms and gardens of her boarding school with educational minigames. This was followed by Madeline European Adventures (also known as Madeline European Vacation), in which Madeline tracks down a man who stole a genie's magic lamp and travels to Zermatt, Venice and Istanbul. Madeline Classroom Companion: 1st and 2nd Grade was part of the Madeline Classroom Companion series, with games designed for children aged four to eight. The story follows Madeline on a tour of her Paris neighborhood. Madeline Thinking Games Deluxe was a combination of Madeline Thinking Games and Madeline European Adventures. Madeline Rainy Day Activities, the sixth game, is set in Madeline's Catholic boarding school in Paris and follows her as she busies herself during rainy weather.

Madeline 1st and 2nd Grade Reading is also set in the boarding school, where Madeline guides the player through activities encouraging reading comprehension. From Madeline's imaginary magic attic, the player could travel to a carnival in Venice and visit Egyptian pyramids. The game was later re-released as Madeline: 1st and 2nd Grade Reading Deluxe. Madeline Classroom Companion: Preschool and Kindergarten was part of the Madeline Classroom Companion series of games for four- to eight-year-olds. Similar to Madeline 1st and 2nd Grade, it follows Madeline on a tour of her neighborhood with a variety of activities.

Madeline 1st and 2nd Grade Math, the final game in the series, was released as a two-CD-ROM set on July 12, 1999. The discs were also sold separately as Madeline 1st Grade Math and Madeline 2nd Grade Math. Set in the Louvre and the Musée d'Orsay, Madeline guides the player through nine works of art. Each is given a Madeline-related name change; the Mona Lisa is reimagined as Mona Clavel after Miss Clavel, the headmistress of Madeline's school. The paintings help teach addition, subtraction, and multiplication. The game was released for the 60th anniversary of the 1939 publication of Madeline.

== Overview ==
=== Gameplay ===
The games have a point and click interface, which players use to navigate through screens, interact with characters and manipulate objects to complete tasks and overcome obstacles at a comfortable speed. The series' gameplay has been compared to other edutainment games, such as Big Thinkers, Fisher-Price video games, JumpStart and Reader Rabbit. The games contain minigames about reading comprehension, mathematics, problem-solving and cultural studies. They have a simple, straightforward design. The interface varied during the series; Madeline and the Magnificent Puppet Show and Madeline's European Adventures were designed to look (and play) like interactive storybook adventure games, and Madeline Thinking Games was designed as a series of in-game activities. Madeline European Adventures requires players to search each screen in first person, similar to Myst.

Screenshot of a minigame in Madeline 1st and 2nd Grade Math.

The minigames' subjects vary; in Madeline 1st and 2nd Grade Reading, reading comprehension and spelling are taught by completing crossword puzzles, arranging words in alphabetical order and finding synonyms and antonyms for words. Madeline 1st and 2nd Grade Math focuses on building math knowledge; Madeline coaches the player through 55 activities covering a two-year mathematics curriculum, including lessons on "logic, time, money skills, sequencing, fractions, geometry, estimation, and patterns".

Basic French and Spanish vocabulary are taught throughout the series. In Madeline and the Magnificent Puppet Show: A Learning Journey players can click on objects to hear English, French and Spanish, and can review vocabulary by playing "Concentration". Madeline European Adventures contains 100 words in Spanish and French and information about European countries, flags, and culture through an interactive map and repeatable activities. The series' gameplay includes references to European culture and foreign languages.

In-game activities include dressing up Madeline's friends (and dog) in a variety of outfits and creating postcards, masks, door signs and stickers. In Madeline Thinking Games Deluxe, the player can design Madeline's bedroom by changing its wallpaper, carpeting and furniture. Personalized graphics, printable activities and reward certificates are common to the games, and players can watch (and sing along with) music videos in Madeline Thinking Games.

Madeline was targeted at younger players, with age recommendations varying by reviewers. The series was deemed appropriate for "even the youngest pre-readers" by one video-game reviewer; according to others, the series was best suited for kindergarten to second-grade players. A SuperKids reviewer suggested that young children might require adult assistance due to the games' complex skill requirements; although the series was appropriate for older players, the games were not sufficiently challenging. It is primarily a single-player series except for Madeline 1st and 2nd Grade Math, which includes six multiplayer games with different levels of difficulty.

The games have several methods for tracking progress. Madeline is an in-game helper, providing encouragement and hints supporting the learning process through positive reinforcement; according to an Orlando Sentinel article, "the effervescent Madeline is there to offer frequent encouragement and reward correct answers". The games have a progress tracker to keep parents and educators informed of a player's performance, highlighting activities in which they excel or may need assistance. One feature recognizes skill mastery and increases difficulty automatically, but is not present in all the games. Some games, such as Madeline European Adventures, have a user guide with hints and a walkthrough to help a player who is stuck or quickly teach the gameplay to a parent. Several games allow the player to track their progress with printable cards, postcards, and games that players can play away from the computer.

=== Settings and characters ===
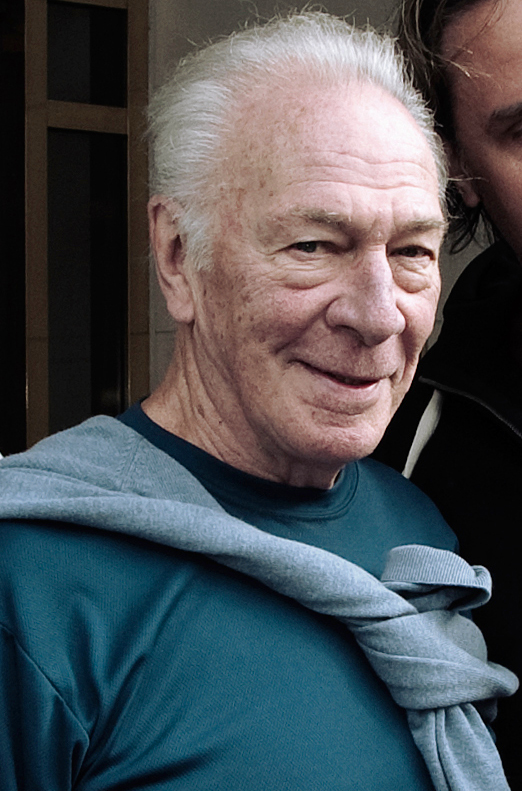
Christopher Plummer narrated both the television and video-game series.

Most of the Madeline series is set in Madeline's boarding school or the surrounding neighborhood. The two exceptions are Madeline European Adventures (which includes Italy, Switzerland and Turkey) and Madeline 1st and 2nd Grade Math, set in the Louvre and the Musée d'Orsay. Although Madeline 1st and 2nd Grade Reading is set in the boarding school, Madeline and the player can also travel to Italy and Egypt from a magic attic. Throughout the series, Madeline is tasked with helping several characters reach their goals. The series includes original artwork (emulating watercolor painting) for the backgrounds and full animation; Madeline and the Magnificent Puppet Show has 30 background scenes and over 10,000 frames of original animation. The TV series' theme song is heard at the beginning of each game. American author Annie Fox, who had co-created the edutainment Putt-Putt series, contributed to the development of the Madeline games.

Madeline is a guide (or teacher) for the player throughout the minigames, and the series was cited as unique for its female protagonist. Madeline's dog Genevieve is featured in several games, supplying hints about how to complete an activity in Madeline 1st and 2nd Grade Math and helping Madeline search for the genie's magic lamp in Madeline European Adventure. In Madeline 1st and 2nd Grade, Madeline helps Miss Clavel complete equations on an easel. Madeline's Spanish neighbor, Pepito, is featured in the "reading comprehension and problem solving" activity "Where's Pepito?" in Madeline 1st and 2nd Grade Reading.

Tracey-Lee Smyth voices Madeline in most of the video games, reprising her role in the television series. Christopher Plummer, who narrated six Madeline specials on HBO (1989–1991) and the TV series Madeline (1993–1994) and The New Adventures of Madeline (1995), returned to narrate Madeline and the Magnificent Puppet Show: A Learning Journey and the later games. In other games, such as Madeline Thinking Games, Madeline is the narrator. Other voice actors from the television series also reprised their roles in the video game in which their character appeared. The voice actors recorded their dialogue at Koko Productions 8th Avenue Sound Studios in Vancouver and the Audio Department in New York.

== Goals ==
=== Education ===
As the only educational software brand focused on meeting the specific needs of young girls, Madeline is a great addition to The Learning Company's growing girls software library [which creates] multimedia products for girls and children that are not only entertaining, but also educational.

— Andy Young, senior vice president of marketing for The Learning Company, PR Newswire

Screenshot of a minigame about reading comprehension in Madeline Classroom Companion: Preschool and Kindergarten.

A major goal of the series was to improve creativity, reading, math, critical thinking and problem solving, and foreign-language abilities for preschool children to third or fourth grade. The growth in development of educational computer software was thought to reflect the desire of parents to begin teaching their children at younger ages. Developers consulted with children, parents and teachers during the design and development of each game. Madeline Classroom Companion: Preschool and Kindergarten was play-tested by children and their parents at the Redwood City Kid's Club and the Sequoia Children's Center, and reviewers indicated that the developers achieved many of their goals. Although up to 90 percent of all software is bought by (or for) boys, Madeline was produced by one of a "handful of companies ... taking a stab at games they hope will appeal to the other half of the population".

Larry Blasko of The Free Lance–Star found that the series filled a void, with games which balanced education with entertainment. Robert Harrow Jr. of The Washington Post recommended the Madeline series to parents as "educational software ... cloaked in games". In her book, Lesson Plans for the Busy Librarian, Joyce Keeling described how to incorporate Madeline video games into school curricula (such as using Madeline Thinking Games Deluxe in math class); according to Priscilla Bennett of School Library Journal, the games "should be popular in schools, homes, and public libraries". A school in Hope Meadows, Illinois offered the program as a reward for children who had read for 15 minutes, and Madeline Classroom Companion: 1st and 2nd Grade Reading Deluxe was a resource at the Washington-Centerville Public Library in 1999. Education lecturer Tom Lowrie wrote in a paper, "Using Technology to Enhance Children's Spatial Sense", that the interactive program Madeline Thinking Games is commonly used to test "for a range of visual and spatial understandings" in children. Sebastian Dortch of the St. Petersburg Times wrote that when his three-year-old son woke up, he said that he wanted to "play Madeline"; Dortch considered it a "ringing endorsement".

Joe Szadkowski of the Washington Post wrote that each CD of Madeline 1st and 2nd Grade Math covered one year of educational material. According to Software and CD-ROM Reviews on File, the Madeline Classroom Companion games contained the "basic elements of [the] school curriculum"; it cited Philip Bishop's Family PC review, which said that the games "constitute two complete years of learning, covering pre-reading, pre-math, thinking skills, and creativity". The Chicago Tribune said about Madeline European Adventures that "the games build on each other for cumulative learning". Linda Jewell Carr's paper, "Instructional Programs Used in Home Schools in Five North Carolina Counties", found Madeline's instructional programs among those played by participants in the exploratory study. In the Washington Post, Beth Berselli said that the games were Creative Wonders "big sellers" which "incorporate a more educational tone" than their contemporaries. Julie Strasberg of PC Magazine, however, wrote that most tasks in Madeline Thinking Games "involve simple observation ... [and] kids may not learn a tremendous amount".

=== Feminism ===
I think that we know that Madeline is a character who is popular with both boys and girls. Although parents are more likely to buy the software for girls, we didn't have to come out and say that. I think it's kind of a turnoff to parents to actually ... see a box that says on it "For Girls Only".

— Creative Wonders producer Holly Smevog, Computer & Entertainment Retailing interview

In 1995, there was a "conspicuous absence" of interactive edutainment software aimed at young girls; thirteen years later, there were 65 titles. Although many of the games (including those by Mattel, Polaroid, Hasbro and Disney) were accused of reinforcing negative stereotypes with themes such as the color pink, makeovers, jewelry, ponies and kitchens, Katie Hafner of the Chicago Tribune and The New York Times wrote that the Madeline and American Girl series achieved the "lofty goal" of providing young players with content which was "carefully designed [and] thoughtful" – popular and "present[ing] players with some intellectual substance". According to an Orlando Sentinel article, "the success of Barbie software ... encouraged other software makers to come out with their own programs just for girls". Creative Wonders product manager Jennifer Rush called Madeline "a good role model" with "an assertive, spunky personality and ... a logical fit in the interactive world". Rush cited the decision to center a series of educational games on the character as an attempt to reach young girls who are "often ignored by multimedia developers", saying that the games fulfilled the "real opportunity in multimedia to develop titles that appeal to girls" and "girls tend to want more of a storyline". According to Creative Wonders software producer Holly Smevog, girls are drawn to "story lines, real-life situations, hands-on experiences and developing relationships with characters".

The Daily Gazette's Susan Reimer wrote that the Madeline games helped revive girls' interest in computers and changed their conception of them as "that solitary, isolating experience"; the games are "based on the idea that girls learn, play and relate to each other in a different way than boys". According to a Beacon News writer, the series resonated with girls because the main character is a young girl and finding software for girls was difficult. Mark Ivey and Elizabeth Kemper of the Daily News wrote that the series was an example of software developers' creating quality girls' software matching that created for boys. James Madge of the Toronto Star called the games "edutainment ... geared at girls", and Selling to Kids said that Creative Wonders was "targeting girls" and "get[ing] girls thinking" with its Madeline series. J.P. Faber of U.S. Kids praised the fact that a "smart little girl is the star", saying that "it's usually a boy who is in charge".

The article "Engaging Girls with Computers Through Software Games" noted that since the 1990s, "several companies have attempted to market a line of software games specifically for girls" and Broderbund's Carmen Sandiego and Creative Wonders's Madeline were two rare examples of "market[ing] girl games that were designed to appeal to boys as well". Software and CD-ROM Reviews on File said that reviewers thought the games would "engage both boys and girls". A Kiplinger's Personal Finance reviewer found an activity in Madeline Thinking Games Deluxe where players have to redecorate Madeline's room "excruciatingly painful" for a male tester, who denied a female tester's claim that he disliked the "girl's game". Although the boys in the HomePC kids' lab did not like the "sweet" Madeline TV show, they were eager to play the video games.

In a press release for Madeline 1st and 2nd Grade Math, The Learning Company (formerly SoftKey) senior vice president of marketing Andy Young described the series as "imaginative product" for girls to play with "their beloved and adventurous friend Madeline ... that children love and parents trust". According to Bestick, girls were more drawn to plot and character development over dominance and violence, and he saw the series as a way to enter this untapped market. Ivey and Kemper noted that boys spent more time on computers than girls, and girls were missing out on learning opportunities; the Daily News identified a trend toward "high skill, not high kill" games, such as the Nancy Drew games and Madeline. According to Terri Payne Butler of The Horn Book Magazine, the series offered a solution for "every young girl who wants to play computer games but has little interest in shootem-up, take-em-out games such as Ninja Turtle". Nancy Churnin of the Los Angeles Times wrote that a child's comfort level can increase if their educational content has familiar characters like Madeline. Donna Ladd of MacHome Journal wrote that a Madeline Classroom Companion game of "Concentration" had a subtle, positive message by asking players to match images such as female forest rangers, police officers and newspaper reporters, with "few portraying traditional gender roles". A Retailing Today article said that the Madeline series was "among the few titles specifically aimed at girls that seems ready for the mass market". The Los Angeles Daily News compared Madeline to the storybook video game Chop Suey; both had heroines and "brightly colored, naive-style illustrations", and were targeted at all children despite "obvious feminine appeal". Shelley Campbell, education coordinator at Wiz Zone Computers for Kids in Vancouver, recommended Madeline European Adventures as a video game which appealed to girls.

== Development ==
=== Creative Wonders (1995–1997) ===
Creative Wonders (also known as ABC/EA Home Software until 1 June 1995), a multimedia software joint venture of Electronic Arts and the Capital Cities-ABC Multimedia Group, was founded in Redwood City, California in December 1994 to develop children's software. It aimed to utilize the "creative, marketing, and distribution muscle of its partners" and cultivate a brand based on quality. ABC contributed a "video archive and production expertise", and EA added "software development experience and retail distribution system". Executive producer and Creative Wonders director of development Michael Pole "supervised the development of children's product lines". In 1993, Pole saw an opportunity for a "recognised, franchisable property which could be marketed to girls in the 7-12-year-old age bracket". Creative Wonders president Greg Bestick envisioned an educational product which would "excite the emotions, stimulate learning, and provide entertaining, yet valuable lessons". The Madeline book and its sequels remained popular decades after its 1939 publication. By 1995 Madeline was a "cultural icon", a "widely licensed character in dolls, games and videos" and "internationally recognized" with Sesame Street's Elmo and Schoolhouse Rock's Lucky Sampson. That year, after Disney's acquisition of Capital Cities-ABC, Creative Wonders and DIC Entertainment became Disney subsidiaries to "dovetail... with Disney's overall corporate strategy". DIC Entertainment had bought the Madeline content rights from Ludwig Bemelmans' estate in 1993, and produced the Madeline TV series for Home Box Office and The Family Channel. Pole acquired electronic rights to the Madeline franchise.

Vortex Media Arts was contracted to provide programming, art, animation, sound, scripts and voice artists for the series, and Creative Wonders was in charge of production, testing, package design, documentation, online assistance, print activities and consulting. Vortex Media Arts was formed by a 1993 merger of game-design and programming-technology company Strategic Visions and art and animation company Lil' Gangster Entertainment. Before the creation of Vortex, Lil' Gangster partner Jay Francis produced the animated Madeline for DIC Entertainment. Although Pole was familiar with Lil' Gangster Entertainment, he did not think that the company could produce an entire title in-house. After the merger, however, Creative Wonders and Vortex obtained the Madeline license from DIC. Madeline and the Magnificent Puppet Show, the first project of the video-game series, was created on a $500,000 budget and required sales of 60,000 to break even. It cost Vortex $300,000 to produce later Madeline video games. The company saved money during development; many Vortex artists had worked on the DIC television series, and were familiar with the characters and design. Although the video-game series used an existing engine, "overhead, salaries, and marketing" cut into royalty reimbursements.

Vortex vice president Rick Giolito said that the company was pressured "to incorporate Hollywood-type production, techniques, and corporate structure". Creative Wonders streamlined the production process in accordance with Hollywood practice. According to Giolito, the publishers forced Vortex to create prototypes for focus groups. EA required the developer to produce design documents of project milestones. Madeline game artists worked double shifts, sharing computers, desks and phone lines. According to Pole, "Madeline doesn't belong on the Sony Playstation". The Madeline series was Creative Wonders' "flagship product".

=== The Learning Company era (1997-1999) ===
In 1995, the Learning Company was acquired by SoftKey. At the end of December 1997, The Learning Company (formerly SoftKey) acquired Creative Wonders from Capital Cities-ABC and Electronic Arts. The acquisition added Madeline to the company's assets. According to The Salt Lake Tribune, some games were published by Davidson/Creative Wonders. During the mid-1990s, after personal-computer prices fell, software companies begin marketing to families. The Learning Company (formerly SoftKey) capitalized on demand for educational software by purchasing franchises such as Sesame Street and Madeline from smaller companies, and chief executive Michael Perik wanted the company to incorporate recognizable brands into its catalogue.

The Learning Company (formerly SoftKey) published the Madeline video-game series under its LearningBuddies brand. Some games in the series, such as Madeline's European Adventures, were published under the SmartSaver brand. The Learning Company (formerly SoftKey) established LearningBuddies for "developmental reading and math skills programs" based on Madeline and other characters from children's literature and cartoons, such as Dr. Seuss and the Winnie the Pooh franchise, to attract a younger audience. The Learning Company (formerly SoftKey) senior vice president of marketing Andy Young wanted children to "learn important skills from their all-time favorite friends". In 1997, Terri Payne Butler of The Horn Book Magazine wrote that popular children's characters (including Madeline) had entered the "burgeoning world of CD-ROM". SoftKey founder Kevin O'Leary said in 1998: "We have recently acquired widely known brands such as Sesame Street, Madeline and Cyber Patrol to our stable of strong brand equities". According to The Learning Company (formerly SoftKey) director of corporate communications Susan Getgood: "The more we give [players] familiar things, the better they learn".

O'Leary had wanted The Learning Company (formerly SoftKey) to "produce products to service that 40 percent of the market that hasn't bought educational software because of pricing issues". This resulted in a budget line of "platinum" CD-ROM products; the company became known for aggressively driving down the development costs of products and laying off employees of the companies it acquired. After 1997, Madeline products were manufactured by BMG manufacturing division Sonopress and orders were fulfilled by BMG Distribution. They were distributed to a number of retail outlets, including Best Buy, Circuit City, Computer City, Egghead Software, Office Depot, Price Club/Costco, Sam's Club and Staples. Robin Ray of the Boston Herald wrote in 1998 that the repackaging of two games into Madeline's Thinking Games Deluxe was a bargain. Madeline and the Magnificent Puppet Show was released at a higher price three years earlier, but Madeline Rainy Day Activities and Madeline Thinking Games Deluxe were introduced in late 1998 for the holiday season. Presage Software developed the Macintosh, Windows98, and Windows95 versions of Madeline 1st and 2nd Grade Reading.

=== Mattel and discontinuation (since 1999) ===
During the late 1990s (when the Madeline series was released), The Learning Company (formerly SoftKey) was accused of being "burdened with tired brands", cutting research and development and focusing on repackaging old products through convenience stores and drugstores rather than investing in new software by the development companies it had acquired. The company had continued to grow, with revenue of $800 million despite an accumulated deficit of $1.1 billion by the end of 1998. Mattel CEO Jill Barad made a takeover bid to overcome a downward slide in her company's stock price, "seiz[ing] on educational software as a driver of future growth". Mattel's Barbie had been successful, and the company wanted to expand its product line to the Madeline series' "well-developed characters". A few weeks after the sale, the Center for Financial Research and Analysis forensic accounting firm published a report critical of Mattel. O'Leary, who had been hired as president of Mattel's new TLC digital division, sold his stock for $6 million a few months before $2 billion in shareholder value was lost in one day. The Learning Company (formerly SoftKey)'s May 1999 acquisition by Mattel resulted in a loss of nearly $300 million, and was the end of the mid-1990s edutainment boom. Former The Learning Company (formerly SoftKey) educational design department manager Toby Levenson said that edutainment had become "a toxic word" after the company's merger with Mattel, and Businessweek called the acquisition one of the worst deals of all time. Lee Banville, editor of Gamesandlearning.org, wrote that the collapse of the market for children's education games reflected the difficulty of growing and diversifying a business. Although the Madeline video-game series was cancelled in 1997, Madeline 1st and 2nd Grade Math was released two years later by Mattel (the last release of the series before Creative Wonders closed later that year).

The Madeline video-game assets were distributed among several companies at the turn of the 21st century; The Learning Company (formerly SoftKey) became a subsidiary of Mattel's game division, Mattel Interactive. Mattel sold Mattel Interactive in 2000 to the Gores Group, a privately held international acquisition and management firm. The following year, edutainment development company Riverdeep acquired The Learning Company (formerly SoftKey). In 2002, Encore Software (a privately held home-entertainment and educational publisher) acquired the publishing rights for Madeline and re-released the software under its brand name. That year, the Navarre Corporation distribution company purchased Encore "to strengthen its position in the video game market". In 2006, Riverdeep acquired Houghton Mifflin and became Houghton Mifflin Riverdeep Group. The following year, Houghton Mifflin Riverdeep Group bought Harcourt Education from Reed Elsevier; the resulting company was Houghton Mifflin Harcourt. Houghton Mifflin Harcourt owns the Madeline video-game license, and Navarre Corporation holds the publishing rights or they reverted to HMH after the games went out of print. HMH has not attempted to resurrect the series, unlike the similarly-acquired Carmen Sandiego (which was revived in 2015).

== Promotion ==
Creative Wonders conducted several promotional campaigns for the Madeline games. The first game, Madeline and the Magnificent Puppet Show: A Learning Journey was released for the 1995 holiday season, and the ABC-TV premiere of the Saturday-morning cartoon The New Adventures of Madeline in September; it was part of Creative Wonders software with Bump in the Night and Free Willy, video-game adaptions of ABC's 1995 fall children's-programming lineup. Promotions accompanied Madeline and the Magnificent Puppet Show to cross-merchandise the CD-ROM title and the Madeline television show, including a create-your-own-puppet-show-scene contest. According to Computer Retail Week, the initial shipment of CD-ROMs included a 32-piece kit of Madeline napkins, plates and invitations and bookmark giveaways were also part of the promotion. The company used part of its marketing budget to fund displays of toy, software, doll, book and video merchandise for the Christmas season. The game was showcased at the May 1995 Electronic Entertainment Expo, Creative Wonders' debut at the event.

In 1996, Creative Wonders collaborated with Western Publishing and Sony Wonder to promote Madeline's CD-ROMs and other aspects with a shopping-mall tour. Madeline and the Magnificent Puppet Show: A Learning Journey was part of the Aspire Games Arcade for the Acer Aspire PC. From August to October, it was a choice in a buy-one-get-one-free promotion of Creative Wonders titles sponsored by Electronic Arts. The game was one of four in a marketing campaign where customers received a free video cassette with a CD-ROM purchase. Madeline Thinking Games was introduced at the Electronic Entertainment Expo in June. A panel discussion, "Case Study: Vortex Media Arts' Madeline, From Development to Ship", was moderated by Richard Kahlenberg at the 1996 Children's Interactive Media Festival.

For the 1996 holiday season, Creative Wonders bundled plush toys with Madeline European Adventures. The following year, it launched a website which included Know Europe, a free downloadable game. The software was featured on Australia's ABC Online, and the Madeline's European Adventures game included a free trial of America Online. The company included a "Buy One Take One" deal on its website, where a customer could purchase two products for the price of one. In mid-October 1997, Creative Wonders had a "Buy One, Get One Free" offer for its Madeline Classroom Companion series. During the week of November 4, Computer City introduced a "Just For Girls" software section with entertainment and educational titles for girls aged 4–13; Madeline was among its first series with products and in-store demonstrations.

Golden Books Family Entertainment Home Video and Audio and Creative Wonders collaborated to a cross-promotion in 1998. According to a summer 1998 Los Angeles Times article, Madeline Classroom Companion: Preschool & Kindergarten would be attractive as a result of the live-action Madeline film. The following year, The Learning Company (formerly SoftKey) and Noodle Kidoodle collaborated to celebrate the 60th anniversary of Madeline's publication, and children could play demo versions of the Madeline video games in stores. The Learning Company (formerly SoftKey) donated hundreds of copies of the software to children without access to the learning tools. It collaborated with the educational-store chain Zany Brainy on a Madeline-themed event at which children interacted with the series' latest software. Buena Vista Home Entertainment and Creative Wonders offered purchasers of the television film Madeline: Lost in Paris and an installment of the Madeline game series a free Madeline software program by mail. On April 26, The Learning Company (formerly SoftKey) announced plans to introduce new software (including Madeline 1st & 2nd Grade Math) at the May Electronic Entertainment Expo in Los Angeles.

== Commercial performance ==
In December 1995, Creative Wonders announced that Madeline and the Magnificent Puppet Show: A Learning Journey was as commercially successful as the company's best-selling Sesame Street title. Two titles in the series had total sales of $500,000 from September 1995 to June 1997, and Madeline was the second-bestselling female-targeted brand (after Mattel's Barbie video-game series).

Madeline and the Magnificent Puppet Show: A Learning Journey was the second-most-popular Macintosh title at 11 Software Etc. and Babbage's stores in the Washington, D.C. area for the week ending on March 2, 1997; Madeline Classroom Companion was the most popular educational title at the stores for the week ending on November 22 the same year. Madeline and the Magnificent Puppet Show, Madeline Thinking Games and Madeline's European Adventure were among the year's best-selling educational-software titles. Karen Wickre reported in Upside in January 1998 that a Madeline game was one of two top titles from the Chinese distribution and development company Mediamax. According to PC Data, four of the top ten girls' video games in 1998 were Madeline titles. That December, The Learning Company (formerly SoftKey) Asia-Pacific managing director Tony Hughes said that Madeline Classroom Companion was outselling Sesame Street at Target Australia.

According to PC Data, Madeline 1st Grade and 2nd Grade Math was the ninth-bestselling educational title at 13 software retail chains (57 percent of the U.S. market) for the week of July 17, 1999 and the seventh-bestselling title for the week of August 21. Madeline Preschool/Kindergarten (119,721 units, $2.6 million), Madeline Thinking Games (106,392 units, $1.7 million), Madeline Thinking Games Deluxe (102,164 units, $2.0 million) and Madeline Classroom 1st/2nd (101,331 units, $2.2 million) were ranked sixth, eighth, ninth and 10th in sales and revenue for 1998–1999 girls' titles.

== Critical response ==
=== Gameplay and graphics ===
The Madeline video-game series has been praised as an effective example of edutainment. Joe Chidley wrote in Maclean's that the storyline of Madeline European Adventures is "simple ... and silly without being stupid", with "engaging ... fanciful, surprise-filled" moments for children and humor for parents. The game was praised for making its educational content subtly entertaining, teaching children life skills such as using different currencies and acquiring a passport, and for developing creative-writing skills. The series was praised for its foreign-language instruction as one of only a few such games. Reviewers said that the games would expose young American children to European culture and pique their curiosity. According to some reviewers, the series improved with more activities and educational minigames in later releases.

The series' art, music and sound received positive reviews. Its soundtrack and illustrations were praised as immersive, stimulating, consistent with the television series and faithful to the books. Terri Payne Butler of The Horn Book Magazine wrote that the "character-driven" games are "faithful in spirit, accent, and illustration" to the source material, telling original stories and avoiding the traps of other video-game adaptions of books and TV series. According to a Discount Store News review of the 1996 E3, Madeline Thinking Games had "sharper [and] more detailed graphics than have been seen in the past". Games in the series have received awards. In 1996, PC Magazine gave Madeline Thinking Games its Education/fun 5–9 age group award in an analysis of 500 games. In 1999, the Association of Educational Publishers gave Madeline's Reading 1st and 2nd Grade its Golden Lamp Award in the home-learning category.

The series has also been criticized, with some reviewers calling the early games simplistic; primarily developing point-and-click skills, they would provide only a few hours of entertainment. Some reviewers criticized the series' lack of replayability, due to the games' simplicity. Others called the games too challenging for their target audience, and the game pace relatively slow. The games were also criticized for slight technical glitches and inferior graphics. Transitions between graphics and pictures were considered slow by some critics, and the voices seemed to have static contamination. A Newsday reviewer wrote that in Madeline Thinking Games, "the music is dull (and not the least bit French), the drawings are homogenized, the animation is about as basic as it gets".

=== Voice acting and characterization ===
Madeline's dialogue in Madeline European Adventures
Tracey-Lee Smyth's giggling voice and pseudo-French accent as Madeline and the repetitiveness of the dialogue have been critiqued.

Critics have noted the voice acting for Madeline and its impact on the player. According to Larry Blasko, Madeline's constant giggling, pirouetting, skipping and smiling reflected the games' intended female audience. Although the authors of two SuperKids reviews found Madeline's accent and "encouraging, praising, and giggling" attitude endearing, the New Straits Times' Rhonwyn Hwan-Chi wondered if they would deter a male audience. AllGame's Lisa Karen Savignano compared Madeline's repeated phrases congratulating the player to "fingernails down a blackboard" and suggested "invest[ing] in a good pair of earplugs" before playing the game. Katherine Foran wrote that players might tire of Madeline's "phony accent and endless saccharine praise", and The Daily Gazette's Lynne Touhy called the repetition of "you are so clever" in Madeline's "French-accentuated, high-pitched" voice a deterrent to players. Robin Ray praised Madeline's characterization, but her faux French accent annoyed his young play-testers. Jeffrey Branzburg wrote in Technology & Learning that young players may have difficulty understanding Madeline's French accent, while Macworld wrote that her "exaggerated French accent can be hard on the ears [and] annoying". The New Straits Times' Rhonwyn Hwan-Chi wrote that Madeline spoke "flawless (although accented) English", but a Herald Sun reviewer believed that the character spoke "in the worst fake French accent imaginable". A Home PC reviewer wrote that Christopher Plummer's narration "frees children who have not yet learned to read from the feelings of frustration that come with stumbling through printed directions".

Madeline's characterization received a mixed response from video-game critics. In their book, New Trends in Software Methodologies, Tools and Techniques, Hamido Fujita and Paul Johannesson called Madeline a role model for girls because of her use of problem solving, critical thinking and logic in the games. According to The Record, Madeline's "spirit and enthusiasm are well-suited to [her] coaching and teaching role". Philip Bishop said that the games had the "bounce and charm" of other portions of the Madeline franchise. Kathy Yakal of PC Magazine wrote that "Madeline's warmth as a host" made the series "a nice, gentle activity platform for younger children". Although Computer Shopper's Wayne Kawamoto called Madeline a "feisty female lead" and wrote that the games were potentially "equally enjoyable for boys and girls", Amee Abel said that the series is "especially appealing to girls" because of its protagonist. Reviewers from Children's Software Revue wrote that the games were "popular with girls", and a SuperKids writer called Madeline "the epitome of the strong young female". According to Warren Buckleitner, "you can't go wrong with this solid program".

In their book, Packaging Girlhood: Rescuing Our Daughters from Marketers' Schemes, Sharon Lamb and Lyn Mikel Brown criticized the decorating activities in Madeline's Rainy Day Activities: "On what planet would brave Madeline give a hoot about the color of the living room wallpaper?" Computer Shopper and SuperKids, however, found the most popular activity in Madeline's Thinking Games was "Let's Decorate"; according to SuperKids, testers "frequently returned to the room to rearrange items or totally obliterate their designs and begin anew".

== Legacy ==
Madeline Thinking Games was named one of the top 100 CD-ROMs by PC Magazine.

== See also ==
- List of educational video games
