= Sesame Street video games =

There have been a variety of Sesame Street video games released for video game platforms. Most of the Sesame Street video games were published and developed by NewKidCo.

== Video games ==
=== Big Bird's Egg Catch ===
Big Bird's Egg Catch (originally Grover's Egg Catch) is a 1983 video game for the Atari 2600 developed by Atari and Children's Computer Workshop.

In Big Bird's Egg Catch, the player controls Big Bird as he saves eggs produced by chickens at the top of the screen. These eggs travel down variously contorted chutes to land safely in the basket perched on Big Bird's head. Most eggs count for a single point, but a golden egg will periodically appear that is worth five points. When an egg is dropped, a number of points are lost. At higher levels, the eggs move faster, the chutes become more convoluted, there are more egg-laying hens, and the chutes may even flash invisible. "Turkey in the Straw", the song that plays during the egg-catching, also increases in tempo.

Periodically, Big Bird will exit the screen to count his eggs. During this stage, Big Bird is seen with his basket and numbers flash on the screen progressively faster as he counts. When the total is reached, a song is played and Big Bird dances. The game ends when too many eggs are dropped or a set number of counting sessions is performed.

=== Big Bird's Hide and Speak ===
Big Bird's Hide and Speak is a game released for the Nintendo Entertainment System in 1990. It was the first NES game to feature a digitized voice, in the form of Big Bird. This game stars Big Bird and co-stars Little Bird, and features Bert, Ernie, The Count, Grover, and Elmo.

The game was developed by Riedel Software Productions and published by Hi Tech Expressions.

All four sides of the D-pad move Little Bird to the next window clockwise; A and B Buttons both choose a window. The center buttons (Start and Select) exit to the game select screen.

The game's objective is to choose the correct character or letter, with six different levels. The first two levels are based on simply choosing the window instructed by Big Bird, while the next two needed memorizing since the windows close. In the fifth level, the player has to spell the three-letter word instructed by choosing the right letters. In the last level the player must attempt to spell the most number of different words before a time limit, the letters in the windows change after a new word is created.

=== Cookie Monster Munch ===
Cookie Monster Munch on the Atari 2600

Cookie Monster Munch is a video game developed by Atari and Children's Computer Workshop for the Atari 2600 and released in 1983. The game was programmed by Gary Stark.

The objective of Cookie Monster Munch is to guide Cookie Monster through a simple maze, collecting cookies and placing them in a cookie jar at the bottom of the screen.

Cookie Monster Munch used an Atari Kid's Controller (sold separately), although the regular keyboard controller would also work.

=== Cookie Monster's Quest ===
Cookie Monster's Quest has you play as Cookie Monster, as you wander around Sesame Street looking for your chocolate chip cookie, that you did not eat. Along the way, you help your friends complete quests in this point-and-click game made around 2001.

=== Count's Castle ===
Count's Castle is a video game developed by Atari for the Atari 2600. The game was never finished and was about 80% complete before development was stopped and no prototype has been found. It was going to be a math based game.

=== Elmo's Art Workshop ===
Elmo's Art Workshop is a CD-ROM game produced by Creative Wonders and the Children's Television Workshop. First released as Sesame Street Art Workshop in 1995, it was reissued by Creative Wonders in 1998, and Encore Software in 2002 and 2005. The game's activities allow users to draw, paint and create artwork. Elmo, who is only heard in voice-over, gives instructions throughout.

==== Voices ====
- Kevin Clash as Elmo

=== Elmo's Deep Sea Adventure ===
Elmo's Deep Sea Adventure is a CD-ROM game. The game was released by Mattel Interactive in 2000 and re-released by Sesame Workshop in 2005, and by Encore Software in 2006. Elmo invites users to join him on his deep sea submarine to explore shipwrecks, sunken cities and lost treasure. Oscar, Grover, Zoe, Rosita and Telly also appear. Skills such as critical thinking, problem-solving, and decision making are taught in three play modes, five activities, and two levels.

=== Elmo's Letter Adventure ===
Elmo's Letter Adventure is an educational game for the Nintendo 64 and PlayStation featuring Sesame Street's Elmo and was released by NewKidCo on November 15th, 1999.

=== Elmo's Number Journey ===
Elmo's Number Journey is an educational game for the Nintendo 64 and PlayStation featuring Sesame Street's Elmo, released by NewKidCo on March 10th, 1999.

Players must guide Elmo through three areas, split into two halves each, collecting the numbers needed to answer the mathematical problems posed by each area's host. Play begins on Sesame Street, where the player must choose one of three difficulty levels and then proceed to Elmo's playroom to access a tutorial or talk to one of the hosts in order to access their area. The difficulty level determines how many problems the player must solve to proceed to the next area, and how many mistakes a player can make before game over. Unlike many video games, there are no enemies to defeat and no races against the clock, play revolves around choosing the correct answer to problems and navigating areas with different vehicles.

The Nintendo 64 version of Elmo's Number Journey has been somewhat popular amongst speedrunners in recent years due to the game's short duration.

=== Elmo's Preschool ===
Elmo's Preschool is a CD-ROM game developed by Children's Television Workshop and released by Creative Wonders in August 1996. Elmo guides the user, who chooses to play in one of the five unique playrooms available.

==== Voices ====
- Kevin Clash as Elmo

The game sold more than 150,000 units by January 1997.

=== Elmo Through the Looking-Glass ===
Elmo Through the Looking-Glass is a CD-ROM game. The game was developed by Children's Television Workshop and released by Creative Wonders in 1998 and later re-released by Encore Software and Sesame Workshop in 2004.

It was first released as Reading Adventure. When it was re-released the name changed.

In this game, Elmo goes through the looking-glass in his room to find the little red monster he sees there. Skills emphasized include object identification, visual discrimination, vocabulary, matching, and reading. In 1998, this game was included in the two-disc Elmo's Reading: Preschool and Kindergarten CD-ROM set, along with Elmo's Reading Basics.

The name is inspired by Alice Through the Looking-Glass.

=== Elmo's ABCs ===
Elmo's ABCs is a video game developed by Bonsai Entertainment Corp. and published by NewKidCo. It was released on the Game Boy Color in 1999.

=== Elmo's 123s ===
Elmo's 123s is a video game published by NewKidCo. It was released on the Game Boy Color in 1999.

=== Elmo's World: Pets, Food & Telephones! ===
Elmo's World: Pets, Food & Telephones! is a video game developed and published by Sesame Workshop for the PC in 2001. It received a score of four out of five from AllGame.

=== Elmo's World: Shoes, Bugs & Farms! ===
Elmo's World: Shoes, Bugs & Farms! is a video game developed and published by Sesame Workshop for the PC in 2001. It received a score of four out of five from AllGame.

=== Get Set to Learn! ===
Get Set to Learn! is a CD-ROM game. The game was developed by Children's Television Workshop and released by Creative Wonders in 1996. This game promotes the thinking and problem-solving skills necessary for learning.

==== Voices ====
- Don Reardon as Guy Smiley
- Caroll Spinney as Big Bird and Oscar the Grouch
- Frank Oz as Grover and Cookie Monster
- Jerry Nelson as Count von Count and the Martians
- Fran Brill as Zoe
- Martin P. Robinson as Telly Monster and the Martians

=== Grover's Music Maker ===
Grover's Music Maker (originally called Monkey Music) is a video game for the Atari 2600 developed by Atari in 1983 but never released. The game was programmed by Stephen Keith and Preston Stuart and uses the Atari Kid's Controller.

The game has several songs pre-programmed into it that children can listen to as Grover dances across the stage. Players can also make their own songs by pressing different buttons on the keypad.

=== Grover's Travels ===
Grover's Travels is a 1998 CD-ROM game developed by Children's Television Workshop and released by Encore Software. In this parody of Gulliver's Travels, users join Grover as he meets Big Bird, Elmo, Mr. Snuffleupagus and more. There are six activities designed to teach numbers, shapes, sound recognition, story comprehension and emotions.

=== Let's Make a Word! ===
Let's Make a Word! is a 1995 CD-ROM game developed by Children's Television Workshop and released by Electronic Arts.

Guy Smiley welcomes users to his latest game show. Big Bird, Elmo, Oscar the Grouch, Rosita, Zoe and the Two-Headed Monster also appear. There are 6 different contestants, four locations filled with words, and over 300 words in this game to choose from.

The game was reissued by Creative Wonders, including as part of the two-disc Kindergarten Deluxe CD-ROM set, and later by Encore Software with different packaging.

==== Voices ====
- Don Reardon as Guy Smiley
- Caroll Spinney as Big Bird and Oscar the Grouch
- Kevin Clash as Elmo
- Fran Brill as Zoe
- Carmen Osbahr as Rosita
- Jerry Nelson and Adam Hunt as the Two-Headed Monster

=== Music Maker ===
Music Maker is a Sesame Street CD-ROM released in 1999 by Sesame Workshop and Mattel Interactive.

Elmo, Bert and Ernie, Grover and Cookie Monster lead kids into a music activity center of eight games and activities. The game also includes newly recorded and mixed versions of Sesame Street's greatest hits including "Rubber Duckie", "C is for Cookie" and "Elmo's Song" among others.

==== Voices ====
- Kevin Clash as Elmo
- Steve Whitmire as Ernie
- Frank Oz as Bert, Grover and Cookie Monster

=== Pals Around Town ===
Pals Around Town is a computer game published by Hi-Tech Expressions in 1987 and programmed by Children's Television Workshop. It was released for the Atari, Commodore 64, and the IBM PCjr in cartridge form.

The basis for the game was strictly educational. The player could pick a character (Sesame Street characters available included Bert and Ernie, among others) and could interact with various objects in a variety of settings. Two such settings were a school classroom and an outdoor playground. Some items that could be interacted with included a fishbowl and a globe.

=== Oscar's Trash Race ===
Oscar's Trash Race is a video game for the Atari 2600 developed by Atari and was released in 1984. The game was programmed by Christopher Omarzu and uses the Atari Kid's Controller.

The goal is to help Oscar the Grouch and the little Grouches collect trash in a race. It was meant to give practice in numerical skills and directional concepts.

=== Search and Learn Adventures ===
Search & Learn Adventures is a 1997 CD-ROM game. The game was developed by Children's Television Workshop and released by Creative Wonders in 1997, and re-released in 1998, 2000 (by Mattel Media), and 2004 (by Encore Software). Sherlock Hemlock guides users as they find the clues to solve puzzles and mysteries. Concepts emphasized are safety, healthy eating and recycling; skills developed include critical thinking and problem-solving. There are more than 20 activity combinations and multiple skill levels.

==== Voices ====
- Jerry Nelson as Sherlock Hemlock, The Amazing Mumford, Count von Count and Mr. Johnson (The Food Lover)
- Caroll Spinney as Big Bird and Oscar the Grouch
- Kevin Clash as Elmo and Watson the Dog
- Fran Brill as Zoe
- Frank Oz as Bert, Grover and Cookie Monster

=== Sesame Street: Once Upon a Monster ===
In January 2010, Warner Bros. Interactive Entertainment announced plans to make Sesame Street games for the Xbox 360, which will use the Kinect accessory. The title was announced on February 15, 2011 as Sesame Street: Once Upon a Monster, and was released on October 11 of that year.

==== Voices ====
- Kevin Clash as Elmo
- David Rudman as Cookie Monster
- Eric Jacobson as Grover
- Caroll Spinney as Oscar the Grouch
- Martin P. Robinson as Telly Monster and Slimey the Worm
- Dee Bradley Baker as Doo-rays

=== Kinect Sesame Street TV ===
==== Cast ====
- Bob McGrath as Bob
- Loretta Long as Susan
- Roscoe Orman as Gordon
- Sonia Manzano as Maria
- Emillio Delgado as Luis
- Alison Bartlett as Gina
- Desiree Casado as Gabi
- Alan Muraoka as Alan
- Chris Knowings as Chris
- Nitya Vidyasagar as Leela

==== Voices ====
- [[Caroll Spinney as Big Bird and Oscar the Grouch
- Kevin Clash as Elmo
- Fran Brill as Zoe and Prairie Dawn
- Steve Whitmire as Ernie and Kermit the Frog
- Eric Jacobson as Bert, Grover and Guy Smiley
- David Rudman as Cookie Monster and Baby Bear
- Jerry Nelson as Count von Count, Mr. Johnson, The Amazing Mumford and Sherlock Hemlock
- Martin P. Robinson as Telly Monster, Mr. Snuffleupagus and the Martians
- Carmen Osbahr as Rosita
- Leslie Carrara-Rudolph as Abby Cadabby
- Joey Mazzarino as Murray Monster
- Matt Vogel as Forgetful Jones and the Martians

=== Sesame Street A-B-C and 1-2-3 ===
The box art for the compilation of Sesame Street A-B-C and 1-2-3

Sesame Street A-B-C and 1-2-3 are two educational video games for the NES. They were re-released as a compilation cartridge titled Sesame Street A-B-C & 1-2-3.

Sesame Street A-B-C

Sesame Street A-B-C contains two educational video games.

The goal of "Ernie's Big Splash" is to create a series of connections, which include pipes, waterways, sea animals, and some of Ernie's friends including Oscar the Grouch, Bert, Grover, and Cookie Monster that will help Rubber Duckie to make his way to Ernie's bathtub. The game teaches basic logic, directions (North, South, East and West) and sequencing.

In "Letter-Go-Round", the goal is to find the correct letter, spell words, and finding the missing letter of a word. There is also a mode where the player has to make a 'secret' word, by finding the correct letters. This game teaches letter recognition, word recognition, capital and lowercase, and spelling.

The video game was published by Hi Tech Expressions, for ages 3 to 6.

"Ernie's Big Splash", one of the minigames, was originally a standalone game published for MS-DOS in 1986, and released for the Nintendo Entertainment System in 1990 as part of Sesame Street ABC. The game was also released for the Unisys ICON operating system, a platform commissioned by the Ontario education system.

Sesame Street 1-2-3

Sesame Street 1-2-3 includes two games: "Astro-Grover" and "Ernie's Magic Shapes", and was released for the NES in 1989.

In Ernie's Magic Shapes, you had to match the right symbol to a base symbol. This game teaches shape and color recognition, and is the only game in the NES line-up of Sesame Street games, that has a tutorial mode, so players can learn how to play.

In Astro-Grover, Grover and his little aliens buddies called 'Zips' teach basic math like counting, adding, and subtracting. Some games include finding the correct number to answer a question, or trying to find a group of the correct number of Zips.

It was developed by Rare and published by Hi-Tech Expressions.

=== Sesame Street: Cookie's Counting Carnival ===
Sesame Street: Cookie's Counting Carnival is the first of four Sesame Street games targeting the Wii and Nintendo DS to be published by Warner Bros. Interactive Entertainment, with a PC version also available. It was developed by Black Lantern Studios and released in 2010 alongside Elmo's A-to-Zoo Adventure. The Nintendo versions utilize motion controls and are packaged with special Wii Remote and Nintendo DS stylus jackets that are intended to make them comfortable to use for young children. This game teaches basic math.

==== Voices ====
- David Rudman as Cookie Monster
- Caroll Spinney as Big Bird
- Chris Knowings as Chris

=== Sesame Street: Countdown ===
Sesame Street: Countdown is a platform game developed by Riedel Software Productions and published by Hi Tech Expressions. It was released for the Nintendo Entertainment System in 1992. Players control Count von Count as they search for a number. The number is chosen in a spinning wheel. Each time players collect the right number, which may be in the form of a number or a collection of items that add up to the number. When players begin, they may choose to move by jumping repeatedly or running.

=== Sesame Street: Counting Cafe ===
Sesame Street: Counting Cafe is an educational game developed by Riedel Software Productions and published by Electronic Arts. It was released for the Sega Genesis in 1994. Players learn how to count numbers with Grover as he tries to count, climb, and jump while collecting food items for counting. Bert has a tendency to throw an egg in the mass and alter the order.

North America was the only region in which the game was released; it uses the American English language.

=== Sesame Street: Elmo's A-to-Zoo Adventure ===
Sesame Street: Elmo's A-to-Zoo is the second of four Sesame Street games targeting the Wii and Nintendo DS to be published by Warner Bros. Interactive Entertainment, with a PC version also available. It was developed by Black Lantern Studios and released in 2010 alongside Cookie's Counting Carnival. The Nintendo versions utilize motion controls and are packaged with special Wii Remote and Nintendo DS stylus jackets that are intended to make them comfortable to use for young children. This game pairs knowledge of the alphabet with an overview of animals.

==== Voices ====
- Kevin Clash as Elmo
- Fran Brill as Zoe
- Chris Knowings as Chris

=== Sesame Street: Elmo's Musical Monsterpiece ===
Sesame Street: Elmo's Musical Monsterpiece is the last of four Sesame Street games targeting the Wii and Nintendo DS to be published by Warner Bros. Interactive Entertainment. It was developed by Griptonite Games and released in 2012. As with Ready, Set, Grover! and the Nintendo versions of Elmo's A-to-Zoo and Cookie's Counting Carnival, this game utilizes motion controls and is packaged with special Wii Remote and Nintendo DS stylus jackets that are intended to make them comfortable to use for young children. This game intends to teach about musical instruments and using them to play songs.

This was one of the final video game appearances of Jerry Nelson's voice of Count von Count before Nelson died in August 2012 of the year this game was released.

==== Voices ====
- Kevin Clash as Elmo
- Leslie Carrara-Rudolph as Abby Cadabby
- Jerry Nelson as Count von Count

=== Sesame Street: Letters ===
Sesame Street: Letters is an interactive Sesame Street computer game that was originally developed by the Children's Television Workshop in 1991. it was reissued by Creative Wonders in 1994, and The Learning Company or Knowledge Adventure in 2001.

==== Voices ====
- Martin P. Robinson as Snuffy and Telly Monster
- Caroll Spinney as Big Bird and Oscar
- Frank Oz as Bert, Cookie Monster, Grover and Harvey Kneeslapper
- Jim Henson as Ernie and Kermit the Frog
- Jerry Nelson as Sherlock Hemlock and Herry Monster
- Kevin Clash as Elmo
- Fran Brill as Prairie Dawn

=== Sesame Street: Numbers ===
Sesame Street: Numbers is an interactive Sesame Street computer game that was originally developed by the Children's Television Workshop in 1991. it was reissued by Creative Wonders in 1994, and The Learning Company or Knowledge Adventure in 2001.

==== Voices ====
- Kevin Clash as Elmo and Hoots the Owl
- Caroll Spinney as Big Bird and Oscar
- Frank Oz as Bert, Cookie Monster and Grover
- Jim Henson as Ernie, Kermit the Frog and Guy Smiley
- Martin P. Robinson as Snuffy and Telly Monster
- Jerry Nelson as Count von Count, Biff and Sherlock Hemlock

=== Sesame Street: Ready, Set, Grover! ===
Sesame Street: Ready, Set, Grover! is the third of four Sesame Street games targeting the Wii and Nintendo DS to be published by Warner Bros. Interactive Entertainment. It was developed by Griptonite Games and released in 2011. As with the Nintendo versions of Elmo's A-to-Zoo and Cookie's Counting Carnival, this game utilizes motion controls and is packaged with special Wii Remote and Nintendo DS stylus jackets that are intended to make them comfortable to use for young children. This game teaches the basics of personal health, exercise, playtime and relaxation.

==== Voices ====
- Eric Jacobson as Grover
- Kevin Clash as Elmo
- Leslie Carrara-Rudolph as Abby Cadabby

=== Sesame Street: Sports ===
Sesame Street: Sports was published by NewKidCo and was released on PlayStation and Game Boy Color in 2001.

==== Voices ====
- Caroll Spinney as Big Bird
- Kevin Clash as Elmo
- Frank Oz as Cookie Monster and Grover
- Steve Whitmire as Ernie
- Martin P. Robinson as Telly Monster
- Fran Brill as Zoe

=== The Three Grouchketeers ===
The Three Grouchketeers is a 1998 CD-ROM game released in 2005 by Encore Software and Creative Wonders.

This game is a parody of Alexandre Dumas' 1844 novel The Three Musketeers. Telly, Zoe and Grover are on a quest to find King Oscar's missing Royal Pig. Each has a unique talent: Telly knows about shapes, Zoe is good with animals, and Grover reads very well. They must cooperate to complete their tasks.

==== Voices ====
- Frank Oz as Cookie Monster and Grover
- Fran Brill as Zoe
- Martin P. Robinson as Telly
- Caroll Spinney as Oscar the Grouch
