= Terrafly =

Virtual globe

TerraFly
- Developers: Florida International University - High Performance Database Research Center, directed by Naphtali David Rishe, Ph.D.
- Type: Virtual globe
- Website: http://TerraFly.com

TerraFly is a web-enabled system designed to aid in the visualization of spatial and remote sensed imagery. TerraFly users visualize aerial photography, satellite imagery and various overlays, such as street names, roads, restaurants, services and demographic data. Users virtually "fly" over imagery via a web browser, without any software to install or plug in.

Terrafly's tools include geospatial querying, data drill-down, interfaces with real-time data suppliers, demographic analysis, annotation, route dissemination via autopilots, customizable applications, production of aerial atlases and application programming interface (API) for web sites.

== Media coverage ==
The TerraFly project has been featured on TV news programs and worldwide press. It has been covered by the New York Times, USA Today, NPR, as well as Science and Nature journals. FOX News screened in July 2007 a worldwide broadcast on TerraFly assisting exiles in tracking their homeland property.
