= Sesame Street: Get Set to Learn! =

- Developer: Children's Television Workshop
- Publisher: Creative Wonders
- Platform: Windows
- Release: March 1996
- Genre: Educational

Sesame Street: Get Set to Learn! is a 1996 video game developed by Children's Television Workshop and published by Creative Wonders.

== Gameplay ==
The gameplay consists of a collection of short, character‑hosted educational activities in which the player enters different Sesame Street "studios" and completes simple tasks focused on counting, size comparison, patterns, and matching. Big Bird's game has the player spin a wheel to choose objects, place them on his counting tree, and count the items he specifies. Oscar's activity has the player fill his trash barrel with the correct amount of trash twice before dunking Telly, with trash sometimes added or removed. Zoe's game asks the player to compare prizes of different sizes and select the correct one. Cookie Monster presents cookie patterns with one missing piece, and the player identifies the missing cookie to complete the sequence. Another activity shows framed boxes of moons, and the player counts the moons and selects the box with the matching number. Bonus demos of other Sesame Street programs are also included.

== Reception ==
Kids Domain liked the sound and graphics in Sesame Street: Get Set to Learn!. The Oregonian called Sesame Street: Get Set to Learn! a great value for the money.

Sesame Street: Get Set to Learn! was named one of the top 100 CD-ROMs by PC Magazine.
