= ShockHound =

- Type: MP3 (.mp3)
- Launched: November 2008
- Discontinued: May 15, 2011
- Platform: Any
- Status: defunct
- Pricing model: Non Subscription: Per Use
- Website: www.ShockHound.com

ShockHound was an online music download site, retail store and social networking platform launched by Hot Topic in 2008. ShockHound music files were available for download in the MP3 format, making them compatible with most digital music players, and free from digital rights management (DRM) software restrictions. Randy Bookasta (Ray Gun magazine) and Dan Epstein (Revolver magazine) were contributing content editors.

On March 28, 2011, ShockHound posted an announcement stating they would be shutting down for good on May 15, 2011.

== Content ==
ShockHound had an online social networking platform which allowed users to create and share content. Additional website content included music reviews, rock concerts, interviews, music videos, streaming audio, and original programming called Shock Shows, including Taco Tuesday and Stella Can't Cook. ShockHound opened its first retail store in Torrance, California in the Del Amo Fashion Center.

== Cross merchandising ==
In addition to music downloads, music-related merchandise was also available on the website, including band T-shirts, accessories, posters, concert tickets, and Vinyl records. This type of cross merchandising was unique in the digital audio market. ShockHound utilized a proprietary shopping cart functionality which combined music downloads and merchandise purchases into a single transaction.

== Concert sponsorships ==
As part of their opening launch in 2008, ShockHound offered free concerts by No Age, Titus Andronicus and Snow Patrol, to users in Chicago, Los Angeles, San Francisco, Las Vegas and San Diego.
