= Big Bird's Egg Catch =

1983 video game

- Developers: Atari, Inc. Children's Computer Workshop
- Publishers: Atari, Inc.
- Platform: Atari 2600
- Release: November 1983
- Genre: Educational
- Modes: Single-player, multiplayer

Gameplay of Big Bird's Egg Catch

Big Bird's Egg Catch is an educational video game for the Atari 2600 developed by Atari, Inc. and Children's Computer Workshop and published by Atari in 1983.

== Gameplay ==
In Big Bird's Egg Catch, the player controls Big Bird from Sesame Street as he saves eggs produced by chickens at the top of the screen. These eggs travel down variously contorted chutes to land safely in the basket perched on Big Bird's head. Most eggs count for a single point, but a golden egg will periodically appear that is worth five points. When an egg is dropped, a number of points are lost. At higher levels, the eggs move faster, the chutes become more convoluted, there are more egg-laying hens, and the chutes may even flash invisible. "Turkey in the Straw", the song that plays during the egg-catching, also increases in tempo.

Periodically, Big Bird will exit the screen to count his eggs. During this stage, Big Bird is seen with his basket and numbers flash on the screen progressively faster as he counts. When the total is reached, a song is played and Big Bird dances. The game ends when too many eggs are dropped or a set number of counting sessions is performed.

Big Bird's Egg Catch bears many similarities to other games of the time, such as Kaboom!. What sets it apart is that this game does not use a paddle controller common to games with similar gameplay.

== Reception ==
Suzan D. Prince for Electronic Fun with Computers & Games said "Big Bird will definitely be a hit with the kindergarten set, while parents might just find themselves sneaking in a round every now and then."

== See also ==
- Alpha Beam with Ernie
- Cookie Monster Munch
