= SchoolHouse Rock!: 1st-4th Grade Math Essentials =

- Developer: Human Code
- Publisher: Creative Wonders
- Platforms: Windows; Macintosh
- Release: 1997
- Genre: Math

SchoolHouse Rock!: 1st-4th Grade Math Essentials is a 1997 video game developed by Human Code and published by Creative Wonders.

== Gameplay ==
The player completes a collection of math-themed arcade activities based on Schoolhouse Rock. In Concentration, the player matches number cards with equation products; in Tortoise and the Bears, the player guides a tortoise through a maze while collecting items and avoiding bears; in Geometron, the player places lines to complete shapes and score points; in Lucky Rocks, the player defends a base and lettered targets from meteors and flying saucers; in Math Machine, the player forms equations from provided numbers and symbols; in Lucky's Math Gallery, the player uses water balloons to hit targets matching a stated condition; and in Magic Numbers, the player adds, subtracts, multiplies, and divides numbers to reach a required result while competing against Lucky. The game includes multiple difficulty levels that progress with the player and covers areas such as arithmetic, logic, and sequencing.

== Development ==
In August 1996, Human Code has secured deals to develop nine new CD-ROM titles for Creative Wonders. Human Code would produce multimedia presentations of the old "Schoolhouse Rock" series of educational cartoons.

== Reception ==
All Game Guide found Schoolhouse Rock! 1st-4th Grade Math Essentials to be disappointing. SuperKids called School House Rock! 1st - 4th Grade Math Essentials a program that provides fun-filled opportunities for the young student to experience mathematics.
