= Virtual globe =

3D software model or representation of Earth or another world

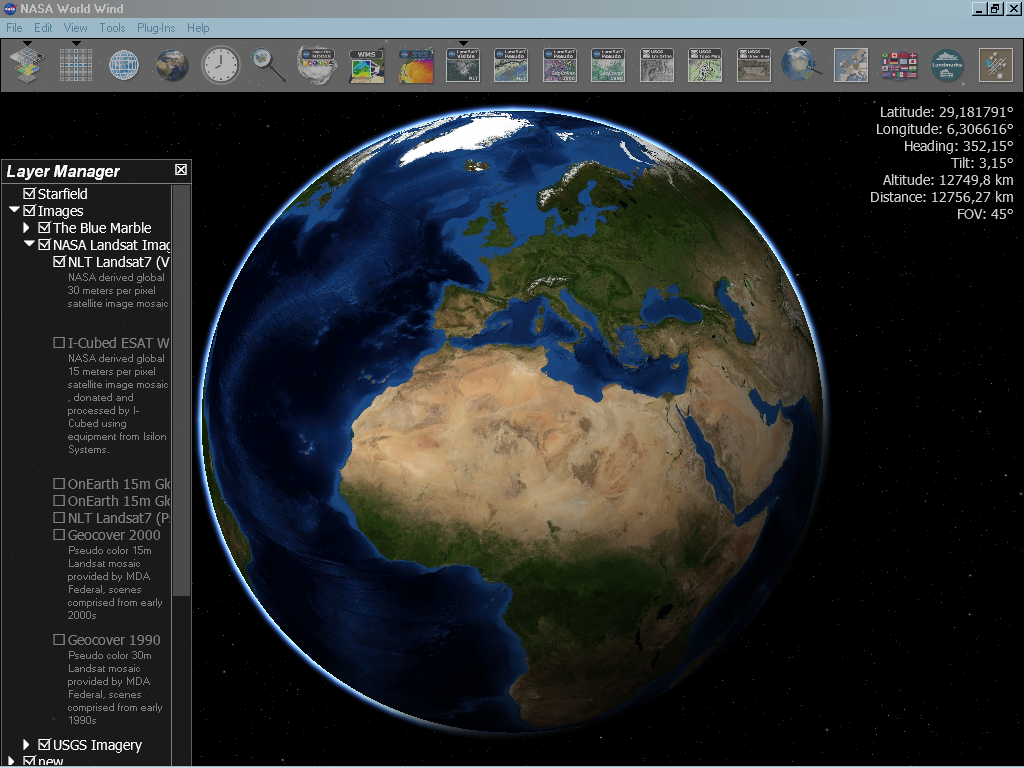
NASA WorldWind, an open-source virtual globe with stars and advanced atmosphere and sunlight effects

A virtual globe is a three-dimensional (3D) software model or representation of Earth or another world. A virtual globe provides the user with the ability to freely move around in the virtual environment by changing the viewing angle and position. Compared to a conventional globe, virtual globes have the additional capability of representing many different views of the surface of Earth. These views may be of geographical features, man-made features such as roads and buildings, or abstract representations of demographic quantities such as population.

In 1993 the first version of Terravision was released, and in 1994 Art+COM presented it in the ITU Plenipotentiary Conference of Kyoto. Microsoft released an offline virtual globe on November 20, 1997, in the form of Encarta Virtual Globe 98, followed by Cosmi's 3D World Atlas in 1999. The first widely publicized online virtual globes were NASA WorldWind (released in mid-2004) and Google Earth (mid-2005).

== Types ==
Virtual globes may be used for study or navigation (by connecting to a GPS device) and their design varies considerably according to their purpose. Those wishing to portray a visually accurate representation of the Earth often use satellite image servers and are capable not only of rotation but also zooming and sometimes horizon tilting. Very often such virtual globes aim to provide as true a representation of the world as is possible, with worldwide coverage up to a very detailed level. When this is the case, the interface often has the option of providing simplified graphical overlays to highlight man-made features, since these are not necessarily obvious from a photographic aerial view. The other issue raised by such detail available is that of security, with some governments having raised concerns about the ease of access to detailed views of sensitive locations such as airports and military bases.

Another type of virtual globe exists whose aim is not the accurate representation of the planet, but instead a simplified graphical depiction. Most early computerized atlases were of this type and, while displaying less detail, these simplified interfaces are still widespread since they are faster to use because of the reduced graphics content and the speed with which the user can understand the display.

=== List of virtual globe software ===
As more and more high-resolution satellite imagery and aerial photography become accessible for free, many of the latest online virtual globes are built to fetch and display these images. They include:

- ArcGIS Explorer, a lightweight client for ArcGIS Server, supports WMS and many other GIS file formats. Retired as of Oct 1, 2017.
- ArcGIS Earth, a 3D application for viewing, editing and sharing GIS data. Supports WMS, KML, Shapefile, and other GIS file formats.
- Bing Maps, 3D interface runs inside Internet Explorer and Firefox, and uses NASA Blue Marble: Next Generation.
- Bhuvan is an India-specific virtual globe.
- EarthBrowser, an Adobe Flash/AIR-based virtual globe with real-time weather forecasts, earthquakes, volcanoes, and webcams.
- Google Earth, satellite and aerial photos dataset (including commercial DigitalGlobe images) with international road dataset, the first popular virtual globe along with NASA World Wind.
- Marble, part of KDE, with data provided by OpenStreetMap, as well as NASA Blue Marble: Next Generation and others. Marble is free and open-source software (LGPL).
- NASA World Wind, USGS topographic maps and several satellite and aerial image datasets, the first popular virtual globe along with Google Earth. World Wind is open-source software (NOSA).
- NORC is a street view web service for Central and Eastern Europe.
- OpenWebGlobe, a virtual globe SDK written in JavaScript using WebGL. OpenWebGlobe is free and open-source software (MIT).
- WorldWide Telescope features an Earth mode with emphasis on data import/export, time-series support and a powerful tour authoring environment.

As well as the availability of satellite imagery, online public domain factual databases such as the CIA World Factbook have been incorporated into virtual globes.

=== History ===
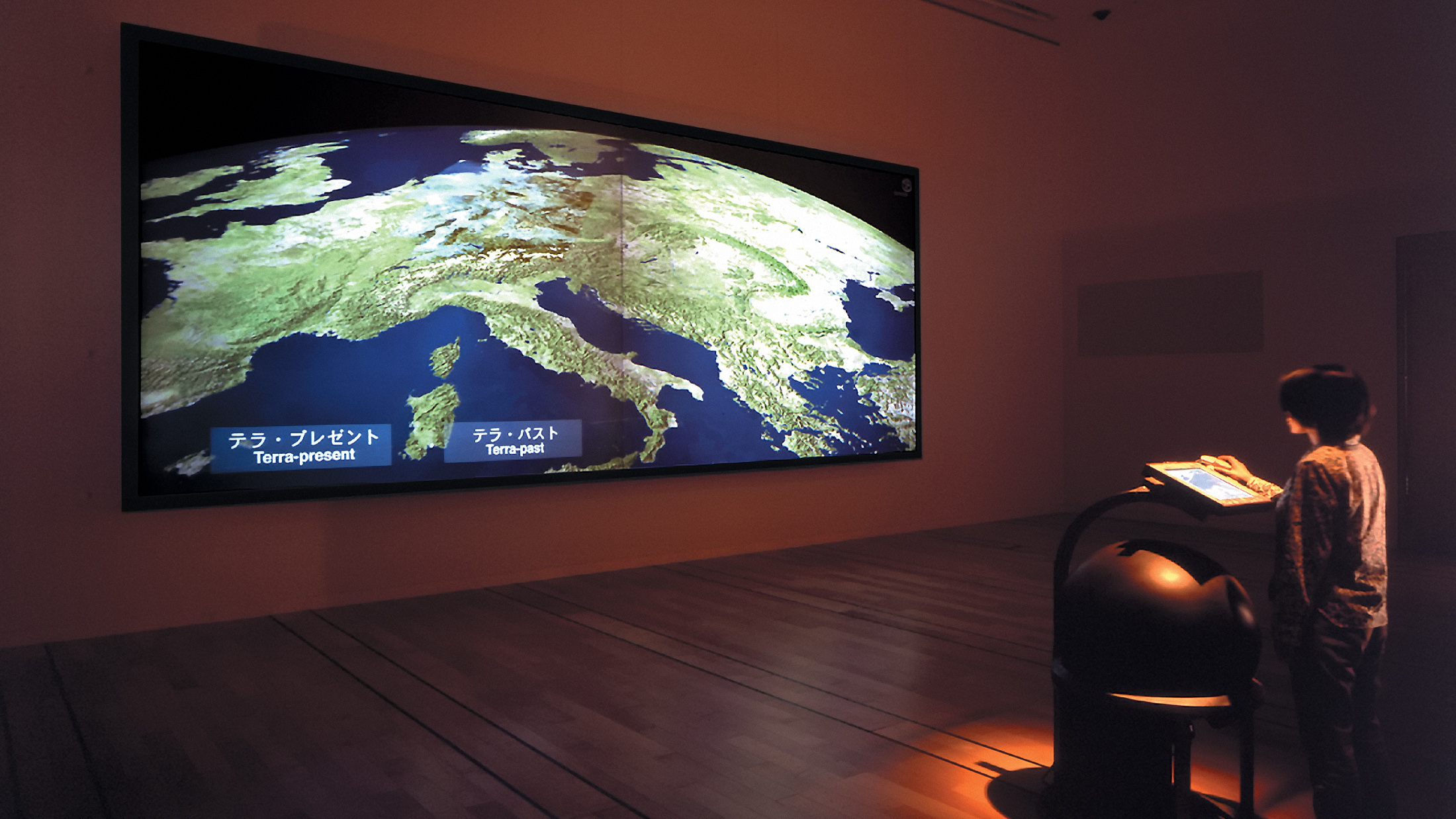
Terravision installation at NTT InterCommunication Center, 1998.

In 1993 the German company ART+COM developed a first interactive virtual globe, the project Terravision; supported by the Deutsche Post as a "networked virtual representation of the Earth based on satellite images, aerial shots, altitude data and architectural data".

The use of virtual globe software was widely popularized by (and may have been first described in) Neal Stephenson's famous science fiction novel Snow Crash. In the metaverse in Snow Crash, there is a piece of software called Earth made by the Central Intelligence Corporation (CIC). The CIC uses their virtual globe as a user interface for keeping track of all their geospatial data, including maps, architectural plans, weather data, and data from real-time satellite surveillance.

Virtual globes (along with all hypermedia and virtual reality software) are distant descendants of the Aspen Movie Map project, which pioneered the concept of using computers to simulate distant physical environments (though the Movie Map's scope was limited to the city of Aspen, Colorado).

Many of the functions of virtual globes were envisioned by Buckminster Fuller who in 1962 envisioned the creation of a Geoscope that would be a giant globe connected by computers to various databases. This would be used as an educational tool to display large scale global patterns related to topics such as economics, geology, natural resource use, etc.

== See also ==
- Digital Earth
- Geovisualization
- Geoweb
- Macroscope (science concept)
- Orbiter
- Planetarium software
- Science On a Sphere
- Terravision (computer program)
- Terragen
