= FRET (software) =

NASA open source software

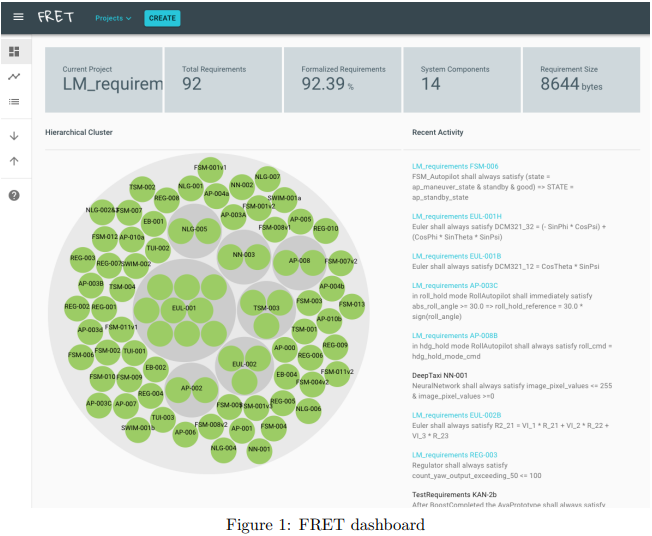
- FRET dashboard
- Developers: Andreas Katis; Anastasia Mavridou; Tom Pressburger; Johann Schumann; Khanh Trinh
- Stable release: 3.1 / December 15, 2023; 2 years ago
- Written in: JavaScript
- Operating system: Windows, Linux, OS X
- Type: Formalizing
- License: NASA Open Source Agreement version 1.3
- Website: https://github.com/NASA-SW-VnV/fret

Formal Requirements Elicitation Tool (FRET) is a requirements engineering tool. It was developed by the NASA Ames Research Center to specify complex safety-critical systems whose failure could result in loss of life, significant property damage, or environmental harm. FRET is open-source software released under the NASA Open Source Agreement.

== Background ==
The behavior and features of a system are specified by its requirements. Most requirements are written in natural languages such as English, which is easy for analysts and stakeholders to understand but cannot be checked for errors and omissions using formal methods. On the other hand, formal notations such as VDM and Z, which are precise and unambiguous, tend to be difficult for analysts and stakeholders to understand.

FRET (Formal Requirements Elicitation Tool) is an open source requirements engineering tool designed for NASA Ames Research Center to formally and accurately specify and analyze safety-critical systems. It translates requirements to a controlled natural language named FRETish, which is then translated to temporal logic. Giannakopoulou, Dimitra; Pressburger, Thomas; Mavridou, Anastasia; Rhein, Julian; Schumann, Johann; Shi, Nija (2020). "Formal Requirements Elicitation with FRET". REFSQ Workshops. CEUR Workshop Proceedings, Vol. 2584. https://ceur-ws.org/Vol-2584/PT-paper4.pdf

As a compromise, FRET requirements are created in a controlled natural language called FRETish and converted into temporal logic.

== Uses ==
FRETish requirements can correspond to variables in external code or models. FRET generates and verifies formal equivalents for each statement, allowing requirements to be imported or exported in a variety of formats including JSON.

In FRET, processes are simulated and analyzed by interfacing with external modeling and analysis tools. The supported external tools include COCO simulator, Simulink Design Verifier, NuSMV, and Copilot.

== See also ==
- Functional requirement
- Non-functional requirement
- Objective
- Requirements analysis
- Software engineering
- Software Engineering Body of Knowledge
- Software requirements
- Software requirements specification
- Stakeholder analysis
- Systems engineering
- List of requirements engineering tools
