= EarthBrowser =

Virtual globe software developed by Lunar software

- Developer(s): Lunar Software
- Stable release: 3.1.2 / 2009
- Operating system: Microsoft Windows, Macintosh
- Type: Virtual globe
- License: Proprietary

EarthBrowser was a virtual globe software developed by Lunar software. It was available online as a Flash application or could be installed locally as an AIR application. It focused mainly on visualising geophysical information such as weather, earthquakes, clouds, weather conditions, etc. It showed the earth as satellite images.

EarthBrowser was originally developed in 1996 by Matt Giger, a University of Oregon graduate student, under the name Planet Earth. It was one of the first applications to show real-time patterns (including weather, earthquakes, and volcanic activity) on a virtual globe. It was largely superseded by the introduction of Keyhole Markup Language, used by most current virtual globe software.
