= ABC NewsLinks =

Software CD-ROM

- Developer: Creative Wonders
- Release: 1996
- Operating system: Windows; Macintosh

ABC NewsLinks, also known as ABC NewsLinks: The Current Events Resource, was a software CD-ROM developed by Creative Wonders.

== Summary ==
ABC NewsLinks was a program that displayed multimedia presentations of the daily news. It covered information about 100 world leaders, 250 countries, political turmoil among other things. ABC anchor Forrest Sawyer was the host of ABC NewsLinks.

== Development ==
ABC NewsLinks was developed by Creative Wonders, a company founded as a joint venture between Capital Cities/ABC and Electronic Arts.

== Reception ==
CNET called ABC NewsLinks a valuable addition to a home reference library. Wisconsin State Journal recommended ABC NewsLinks, recommending it to AOL subscribers.

Profits were held back for the CD-ROM producer behind ABC NewsLinks, which prompted an £150,000 write-off as a result of the product.
