= OpenWebGlobe =

OpenWebGlobe SDK
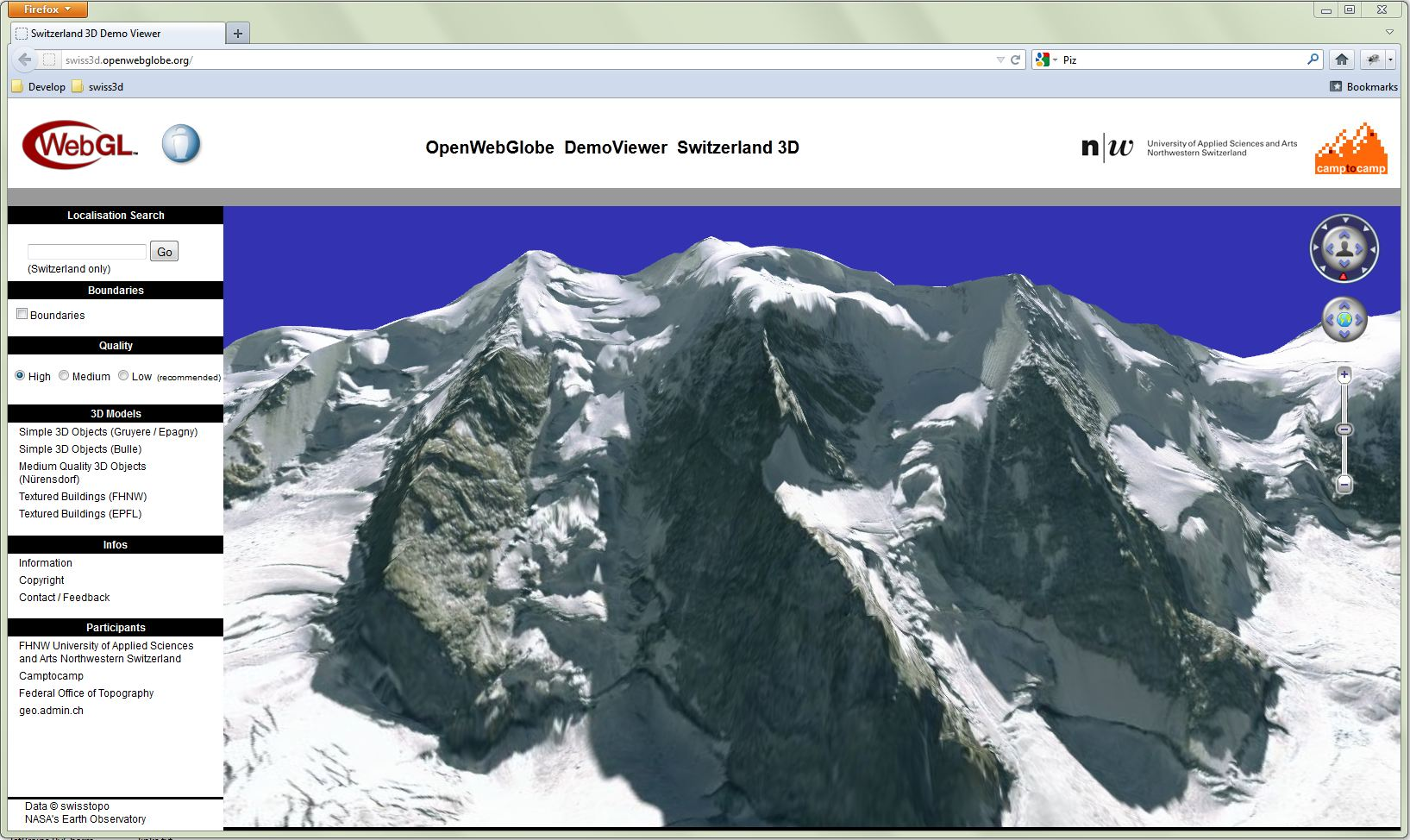
- OpenWebGlobe SDK
- Developer: FHNW - University of Applied Sciences Northwestern Switzerland (German: Fachhochschule Nordwestschweiz)
- Operating system: Cross-platform
- Type: Virtual Globe
- License: MIT
- Website: www.openwebglobe.org

OpenWebGlobe was a project and technology for processing and interactively visualizing vast volumes of geospatial data in a 3D virtual globe, even the forks on GitHub are rather dead . The OpenWebGlobe virtual globe can have several data categories like image data, elevation data, points of interest, vector data, and 3D objects. Before streaming such massive and complex data over the internet, this data must be pre-processed. Such pre-processing usually comprises a transformation from a local to a global reference system, creation of pyramid layers or levels of detail (LOD), tiling of the data, and optionally compression and encryption. Recently, these algorithms were ported to high performance compute cluster using OpenMP and MPI and are also released as open-source. Because data sets are usually large, containing several terabytes, advanced out-of-core rendering mechanisms with a level of detail approach are used for visualization.

OpenWebGlobe is an open-source project. It is written in WebGL. The lead developer is the Institute of Geomatics Engineering at the University of Applied Sciences Northwestern Switzerland (German: Fachhochschule Nordwestschweiz).

== Developing Globe Applications ==
The OpenWebGlobe SDK is also a 3D engine on top of WebGL. With the OpenWebGlobe SDK it is possible to create custom virtual globe applications. This JavaScript "Hello World" example creates a virtual globe and adds an image and elevation layer:

function main()
{
   // (1) create an OpenWebGlobe context using canvas
   // first parameter is canvas-id and second is "fullscreen"
   var ctx = ogCreateContextFromCanvas("canvas", true);
 
   // (2) Create a virtual globe
   var globe = ogCreateGlobe(ctx);
 
   // (3) Add an image and an elevation layer
 
   var imgBlueMarble500 = 
   {
      url     : ["http://www.openwebglobe.org/data/img"],
      layer   : "World500",
      service : "i3d"
   };
 
   var elvSRTM_CH = 
   {
      url     : ["http://www.openwebglobe.org/data/elv"],
      layer   : "SRTM",
      service : "i3d"
   };
 
   ogAddImageLayer(globe, imgBlueMarble500);
   ogAddElevationLayer(globe, elvSRTM_CH);
 
   // (4) Set the background color
   ogSetBackgroundColor(ctx, 0.2,0.2,0.7,1); 
}

== Demos ==
=== Switzerland 3D ===
The demo version of a potential 3D Viewer for geo.admin.ch - the geo-portal of the Swiss Confederation - was online on the OpenWebGlobe's website until July 31, 2012. The scene covered the entire Switzerland and was based on high resolution data from swisstopo (SWISSIMAGE).

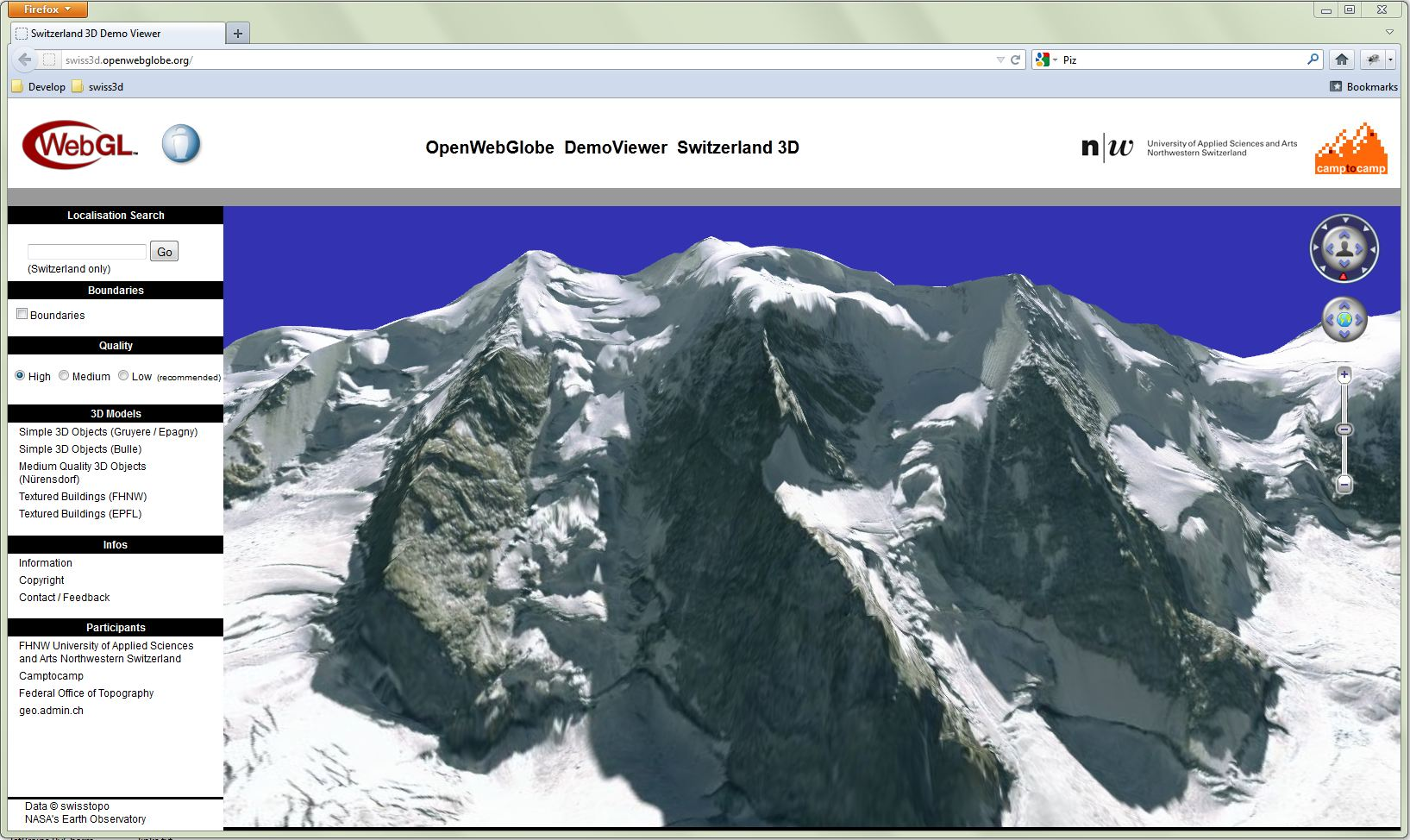
The Piz Palü, as visible on the OpenWebGlobe Swiss demo
