= 3D Atlas =

- Developer: Creative Wonders
- Platforms: Windows; Macintosh
- Release: 1994; October 1996; 1997

3D Atlas is an educational multimedia software application developed by Creative Wonders and published by Electronic Arts. It consists of the original 3D Atlas as well as 3D Atlas 97 and 3D Atlas 98.

== Reception ==
Reception

Review scores
Publication	Score
Chicago Tribune	4/4
Macworld	4/5
PC Review	7/10

Stephen Manes of The New York Times said:

"3D Atlas is best at displaying national statistics, letting you graph and compare them in many fascinating ways, including ones you invent. But the inconsistent interface does not always make you aware of scale."

CNET said:

"Still, 3D Atlas offers excellent introductory information for anyone interested in learning more about the earth."

By 1997, 3D Atlas had sold more than 2 million units.

The application won the "Best International Reference Product" Award from the European Multimedia Association. It also won MacUser's "Best Reference Award".

== See also ==
- 3D World Atlas
