= 3D World Atlas =

Virtual globe program

- Developer: Cosmi Corporation
- Stable release: 2.1
- Operating system: Microsoft Windows
- Type: Virtual globe

3D World Atlas is a virtual globe program developed by the Cosmi Corporation.

== History ==
3D World Atlas was created by the Cosmi Corporation in 1999. It was programmed by Ron Paludan and the research was done by Eve Paludan. Information came from the 1999 World Factbook by the Central Intelligence Agency and the US Arms Control and Disarmament Agency.

== Features ==
As an atlas software, the 3D World Atlas has many features. These include, but are not limited to, world maps on a 3D globe, thousands of tables and charts, national flags, and a world clock. The software also includes distance measuring and in-depth information on every country, including independence days, government types, and such. There are many tools the users can use on the program. These all perform basic tasks helping the viewer in understanding the world. A zoom feature allows to zoom into countries, and lists major cities, a print option allows to print the current display of a page, and a find button allows to find any city, country, river, lake, or continent within seconds.

Other features include the ability to copy the current view onto the clipboard, where it can by displayed by pasting it on an image program such as Microsoft Paint, thematic maps, charts, and clocks that all allow the user to customize the area, an "Earth shadow" feature which creates a shadow on the Earth if on 3D, and a 2D feature that allows to see the Earth from a map perspective. The program also allows the user to retrieve the coordinates of any point on Earth by hovering mouse over the location the users want to know.

== Awards ==
3D World Atlas won the "editor's pick" from online software reviewer Software Informer.

== See also ==
- 3D Atlas
