= Alpha Beam with Ernie =

1983 video game

- North American cover art
- Developers: Atari, Inc. Children's Computer Workshop
- Publishers: Atari, Inc.
- Programmers: Michael Callahan; Preston Stuart
- Platform: Atari 2600
- Release: NA: November 1983; JP: 1983
- Genre: Edutainment
- Mode: Single-player

Alpha Beam With Ernie is an edutainment video game released for the Atari 2600 by Atari, Inc. in 1983. It was developed in conjunction with the Children's Computer Workshop. The game was programmed by Michael Callahan and Preston Stuart.

== Gameplay ==
Gameplay screenshot

The object of Alpha Beam is to help Sesame Street's Ernie pilot a small shuttle, collect fuel tanks (marked by a letter of the alphabet), and return them to his space ship so that he can return to Earth.

The game was marketed as a family-friendly game that could teach children pre-reading skills such as identifying and matching letters. Alpha Beam was compatible with the Atari Kid's Controller, which was sold separately, although the regular controller is also compatible.
