= NASA Open Source Agreement =

Open source software license

- NASA logo
- Author: NASA
- Latest version: 1.3
- Publisher: NASA
- Published: ?
- SPDX identifier: NASA-1.3
- Debian FSG compatible: No
- FSF approved: No
- OSI approved: Yes
- GPL compatible: No
- Copyleft: Yes
- Linking from code with a different license: Yes?
- Website: opensource.gsfc.nasa.gov/nosa.php

The NASA Open Source Agreement (NOSA) is an Open Source Initiative-approved software license. The United States National Aeronautics and Space Administration (NASA) releases some software (such as NASA World Wind and FRET) under this license.

== Legislation and NASA policy ==
Publication of open source software fits in with Agency functions outlined under the National Aeronautics and Space Act, that is, to "provide for the widest practicable and appropriate dissemination of information concerning its activities and the results thereof."

The NOSA was a point of discussion for NASA's Open Source Summit in March 2011.

== Reception ==
NOSA 1.3 has been approved as an open source license by the Open Source Initiative (OSI). The Free Software Foundation, however, raises issue with the following clause:

G. Each Contributor represents that its Modification is believed to be Contributor's original creation and does not violate any existing agreements, regulations, statutes or rules, and further that Contributor has sufficient rights to grant the rights conveyed by this Agreement.

The FSF states that "free software development depends on combining code from third parties", and because of this requirement that changes must be "original creation" the license is not a free software license.

In 2018 a consensus study report of the National Academies of Sciences, Engineering, and Medicine acknowledged that uncertainties about the interpretation of the license served as "a barrier to contributing to NOSA-licensed software."

== See also ==
- Permissive and copyleft licenses
- Glossary of legal terms in technology
- List of software licenses
