= Sesame Street: Elmo's Preschool =

1996 video game

Elmo's Preschool
- Developer: Children's Television Workshop
- Publisher: Creative Wonders
- Platforms: Windows, Macintosh
- Release: September 1996
- Genre: Educational
- Mode: Single-player

Elmo's Preschool is a 1996 video game published by Creative Wonders. It is a Sesame Street–licensed educational video game where preschool-age players learn number, letter and shape recognition with Elmo. Upon release, the game was commercially successful and received positive reviews, with critics praising the translation of the educational methodology of Sesame Street to a software medium.

== Gameplay ==
Gameplay screenshot

Players complete 15 activities set in Elmo's backyard playground. The activities span five locations including a clubhouse, treehouse, tent, letters and music room, and teach basic concepts including pattern recognition, counting, numeracy and shape recognition. In the Face Treehouse, players assemble parts of a face to identify facial expressions. The Shapes and Colors Tent tasks players to reproduce patterns with shapes. The Letters Room teaches players to identify letters and spell three-letter words. The Music Room engages players with sound patterns, and the Numbers Clubhouse with counting skills. Each room features modes that allow players to complete activities in two difficulty modes, or a free play mode. Players use point and click controls to select interactive objects, marked with a sparkle animation, or clicking a door to progress to an activity. When players complete an activity, they are rewarded with an animation.

== Development and release ==
Elmo's Preschool was publisher by Creative Wonders, a joint partnership between Capital Cities/ABC and Electronic Arts to create educational software. The game was released in September 1996 alongside a product line of several games published as part of a newly formed multimedia initiative titled Sesame Street Games. The game was rereleased as Elmo's Preschool Deluxe, including Search and Learn Adventures, and 30th Anniversary Edition, including Elmo's Print Project Center.

== Reception ==
Reception

Review scores
Publication	Score
PCMag	3/5
Children's Software Review	4.5/5
Newsweek	5/5
Personal Computer World	5/5
SuperKids	4.5/5

CIO reported the game had sold $1.5 million in units by October 1998. According to PC Data, Elmo's Preschool and Deluxe were the best-selling educational games in May, June and August 1999.

Several critics praised Elmo's Preschool for translating the teaching methods of Sesame Street to a software medium. Praising the game as a "comfortable environment for early exposure to educational software", SuperKids felt Elmo provided a significant incentive for younger players as a familiar teacher. The Children's Software Review considered the game was "col[or]ful and easy to use", and that it made a "conscious effort" to promote prosocial behavior. Personal Computer World found activities and graphics "fun" and "playful"; whilst it felt children would respond well to Elmo's "cutesy voice" and "enthusiastic and encouraging manner", they considered the voice acting would "eventually drive any normal adult up the wall". PC Mag praised its "solid content, wide range of activities and lovable characters", although felt it lacked a large number of interactive animations. Newsweek enjoyed the game's sense of humor and "bevy of point-and-click opportunities", but felt the "activities can feel a bit claustrophobic" due to their overreliance on interaction with Elmo to change games.
