= Bhuvan =

Indian web-based geoportal developed by ISRO

- Developer: ISRO
- Initial release: August 12, 2009
- Stable release: Beta / August 12, 2015; 10 years ago
- Operating system: cross platform
- Available in: Hindi, English, Tamil, Telugu
- Type: Geographic information system, Virtual globe
- Licence: Freeware / Public domain
- Website: http://bhuvan.nrsc.gov.in/

Bhuvan (lit: Earth) is an Indian web-based utility which allows users to explore a set of geographic content prepared by the Indian Space Research Organisation. The content which the utility serves is mostly restricted to within Indian boundaries and is offered in four regional languages. The content includes thematic maps related to disasters, agriculture, water resources, land cover, and processed satellite data generated by ISRO.

Bhuvan is known for its association with various sections of the Government of India to enable the use of geospatial technology. Since its inception, Bhuvan has enabled the Indian government to host public geospatial data as information layers for visualisation and public consumption. Examples of the types of geospatial layers include the Toll Information System for the National Highways Authority of India, the Islands information System for MHA, cultural heritage sites for the Ministry of Culture, etc. The information for the platform is obtained from government sources or through crowdsourcing.

== Overview ==
ISRO launched the beta version of its web-based GIS tool, Bhuvan, on August 12, 2009. Bhuvan offers detailed imagery of Indian locations compared to other Virtual Globe Software, with spatial resolutions ranging up to 1 metre. At present 177 cities high-resolution datasets are available, while the rest of the country is covered by 2.5m resolution imagery. The images available do not include any military installations in India, due to security concerns.

The National Remote Sensing Agency played an important role in the development of this product. ISRO has used data provided by satellites including Resourcesat-1, Cartosat-1 and Cartosat-2 to get the best possible imagery of India.

== Improvement ==
Since the launch of Bhuvan, users have experienced various difficulties. One problem is that the Bhuvan site has, at various times, been either inaccessible or very slow (due to less bandwidth and servers). Updates to the website later made the Bhuvan portal faster and more responsive. Also, the NSRC created BhuvanLite for a faster experience and also launched Bhuvan Wiki. Bhuvan Wiki is a web application designed for publishing information and engaging Bhuvan users in sharing and contributing their knowledge to other users. It is useful to all Bhuvan users in finding topics of their interest to explore. It provides information on user interests and helps to better connect with the users. Bhuvan does not require login to visualize the maps. Users need to register only when they wish to download satellite data (up to 25m resolution LISS-III data) and products (like NDVI, OHC datasets, Cartosat Digital Elevation Model, etc.) To overcome the plug-in restrictions and platform dependency for 3D visualization, Bhuvan comes with a WebGL-based open-source virtual globe. It only requires WebGL-enabled browsers.

Since the initial, buggy beta release, a more stable version has been released, with which users have reported fewer problems. A discussion forum has also been started for users experiencing difficulties.

== See also ==
- Collaborative mapping
- WikiMapia
- Google Map Maker
- Geo-wiki
- OpenStreetMap
