= Cross merchandising =

Cross merchandising is the retail practice of marketing or displaying products from different categories together, in order to generate additional revenue for the store, sometimes also known as add-on sales, incremental purchase or secondary product placement. Its main objective is to link different products that complement each other or can logically be used in association. This strategy also aims to improve overall customer experience by allowing them to pick up related goods at the same place instead of having to spend time searching for them.

== Forms ==
Cross merchandising generally exists in several forms:

=== Displays ===
Displays involve exhibiting a series of related products which together offers a complete package or solution to the customer's needs. This technique explicitly demonstrates the way multiple different products displayed complement and interact with each other.

Common examples include a clothing store featuring outfits and accessories ensemble on a mannequin, or a department store presenting a full set of furniture and electronics in a showcase window.

=== Secondary placements ===
Secondary placements or merchandising are carried out by showing products of different categories to the same shelf, pegs or aisle. This enables customers to link the related products at the time of purchase, saving their time of travelling down another aisle or luring them into buying additional items that they would not have done otherwise.

This strategy is most typically realised in supermarkets where Italian bread can be found directly in front of the butter and margarine aisle.

=== Link suggestions ===
Link suggestions or redirections describe the attempt of e-commerce platform to encourage additional purchases by displaying a link to complementary goods on the page of a specific product. The advantages of this online product placement approach are the absence of physical constraints and the ability to tailor product suggestions according to individual consumption history.

The use of the section titled "Customers who bought this item also bought..." on the online shopping website Amazon.com is an illustration of link suggestions and how they can constantly adjust with transaction patterns.

== Products ==
An effective cross merchandising programme creates a linkage between the products involves to appeal to customers, and the source of that correlation differs depending on the products themselves. The products being displayed often change over time. Stores regularly adjust merchandise according to season, sales target, consumption pattern and many other factors to maximize impact.

A common type of product used in cross merchandising is complementary goods, which are products that are consumed in conjunction with one another. Electronics and batteries as well as printers and ink cartridges are examples of products that exhibit complementary properties for customers to connect.

Pairing products that offsets the unwanted effects of another is also a conventional strategy often found in cross merchandising. Examples include placing chewing gums next to cigarettes and putting toothpaste beside chocolates and sweets.

== Applications ==
The technique of cross merchandising is not exclusively introduced by supermarkets and department stores. Examples can be found in a wide range of markets, as brands explore new markets and boost sales by cross merchandising their products with each other's.

Markets that frequently adopt cross merchandising include:

- Food and beverage
- Household goods – electronic devices and appliances, and furniture
- Fashion and beauty – clothing, footwear, cosmetics, and personal products
- Supplies – stationery, paper and plastics products
- Entertainment – television, music, games, and live performances
