= Creative Wonders =

Video game company

- Final logo used from 1994 to 1999.
- Formerly: EA Kids (1994-1995)
- Type: Joint venture
- Industry: Computer games
- Founded: December 1994; 31 years ago
- Defunct: 1999; 27 years ago
- Fate: Assets purchased by The Learning Company in 1998 and folded into Mattel Interactive
- Successors: The Learning Company; Mattel Interactive
- Key people: Greg Bestick (president, 1995)
- Products: Sesame Street; Madeline; Schoolhouse Rock! Arthur; Little Bear; Dr. Seuss; ABC World Reference; The Baby-Sitters Club
- Owner: Electronic Arts (50%); ABC (50%)

Creative Wonders was an educational software corporation that was active from December 1994 to 1999. It created computer games based on children's characters like Sesame Street, Madeline, Schoolhouse Rock!, Arthur, Little Bear, Dr. Seuss and ABC World Reference. It was a joint-venture between Electronic Arts and ABC.

== History ==
Logo from 1994 to 1995 as EA Kids.

Creative Wonders started out in 1994 as a division of Electronic Arts called EA Kids before renaming to Creative Wonders. Creative Wonders was responsible for creating popular games like the Sesame Street and Madeline series, and took over publishing of "EA 3D Atlas" which had been created by The Multimedia Corporation in London (a BBC company). In 1995, Creative Wonders teamed with ABC to create the ABC World Reference Series, a series of encyclopedias and atlases on CD-ROM based on "EA 3D Atlas", produced by The Multimedia Corporation and incorporating content and branding from ABC.

In 1998, Creative Wonders' assets were purchased by The Learning Company, and sold ABC and Electronic Arts to that company, and, later in 1999, it was folded into the latter, and later Mattel Interactive.

== Products ==
- Sesame Street (1994–1999)
- Madeline (1995–1999)
- Schoolhouse Rock! (1995–1999)
- ABC World Reference Series (1994–1998)
- The Baby-Sitters Club (1997–1999)
- Arthur (1999)
- Little Bear (1999)
- Dr. Seuss (1999)

== Software ==
=== Sesame Street ===
- Numbers (1994)
- Letters (1994)
- Let's Make a Word! (1995)
- Elmo's Art Workshop (1995)
- Get Set to Learn (1996)
- Elmo's Preschool (1996)
- Search and Learn Adventures (1997)
- Sesame Street: Toddlers Deluxe (1997)
- Sesame Street: Elmo's Preschool Deluxe (1997)
- Sesame Street: Get Set for Kindergarten Deluxe (1997)
- Sesame Street Reading Is Fun Toddler (1997)
- Grover's Travels (1998)
- The Three Grouchketeers (1998)
- Elmo's Reading Basics (1998)
- Elmo's Reading Preschool and Kindergarten (1998)
- Elmo Through the Looking-Glass (1998)
- Bert and Ernie's Rainy Day Activities (1998)
- Baby and Me (1999)

=== Madeline ===
- Madeline and the Magnificent Puppet Show: A Learning Journey (1995)
- Madeline European Adventures (1996)
- Madeline Thinking Games (1996)
- Madeline Preschool & Kindergarten (1997)
- Madeline 1st and 2nd Grade (1997)
- Madeline Rainy Day Activities (1998)
- Madeline 1st and 2nd Grade Reading (1999)
- Madeline 1st and 2nd Grade Math (1999)

=== Schoolhouse Rock! ===
- Schoolhouse Rock!: Grammar Rock (1995)
- Schoolhouse Rock!: Math Rock (1996)
- Schoolhouse Rock!: America Rock (1996)
- Schoolhouse Rock!: Exploration Station (1997)
- Schoolhouse Rock!: Activity Pack (1997)
- SchoolHouse Rock!: 1st-4th Grade Math Essentials (1997)
- Schoolhouse Rock!: 1st & 2nd Grade Essentials (1997)
- Schoolhouse Rock!: 3rd & 4th Grade Essentials (1997)
- Schoolhouse Rock!: 5th & 6th Grade Essentials (1998)
- Schoolhouse Rock!: Money Rock (1998)
- Schoolhouse Rock!: Thinking Games (1998)

=== ABC World Reference Series ===
- 3D Atlas (1994–1997)
  - 3D Atlas 97 (1996)
  - 3D Atlas 98 (1997)
    - 3D Atlas 98 Deluxe Travellers Edition (1997)
- Wide World of Animals (1995–1998)
  - Wide World of Animals '99 (1998)
    - Wide World of Animal '99 And Dinosaurs Deluxe Edition (1998)
- World News Insight (1995)
- ABC NewsLinks (1996)
- Wide World of Dinosaurs (1998)

=== The Baby-Sitters Club ===
- The Baby-Sitters Club: Clubhouse Activity Center (1997)
- The Baby-Sitters Club: 3rd Grade Learning Adventures (1998)
- The Baby-Sitters Club: 4th Grade Learning Adventures (1998)
- The Baby-Sitters Club: 5th Grade Learning Adventures (1999)
- The Baby-Sitters Club: 6th Grade Learning Adventures (1999)

=== Arthur ===
- Arthur's Kindergarten (1999)
- Arthur's 1st Grade (1999)
- Arthur's 2nd Grade (1999)
- Arthur's Reading Games (1999)
- Arthur's Math Games (1999)
- Arthur's Thinking Games (1999)
- Arthur's Preschool (2000)

=== Little Bear ===
- Little Bear: Toddler Discovery Adventures (1999)
- Little Bear: Preschool Thinking Adventures (1999)
- Little Bear: Kindergarten Thinking Adventures (1999)
- Little Bear's Rainy Day Activities (1999)

=== Dr. Seuss ===
- Dr. Seuss Toddler (1999)
- Dr. Seuss Preschool (1999)
- Dr. Seuss Preschool and Kindergarten Reading (1999)
- Dr. Seuss Kindergarten (1999)
- Dr. Seuss Reading Games (1999)

=== Others ===
- Family Album Creator (1996) - adaptation of Delrina's Echo Lake
- Slam Dunk Typing (1997) - adaptation of All-Star Typing 9-12: Basketball Edition (Disk 1)
- Home-Run Typing (1997) - adaptation of All-Star Typing 6-9: Baseball Edition (Disk 1)
- Ice-Hockey Typing (1998) - adaptation of All-Star Typing 6-9: Hockey Edition (Disk 2)
- Type Like A Pro (1998) - adaptation of All-Star Typing 9-12: Soccer Edition (Disk 2)

== See also ==
- Electronic Arts
- ABC
- The Learning Company
- JumpStart Games
- Mattel Interactive
