= MetaCarta =

American geographic information retrieval company

- Type: Private
- Industry: Software
- Founded: 1999; 27 years ago in Cambridge, Massachusetts
- Founders: John R. Frank (CEO & CTO); Doug Brenhouse (COO & CFO); Erik Rauch
- Fate: Acquired in 2010 by Nokia who licensed the product and brand to Finch
- Headquarters: Reston, Virginia, USA
- Key people: Ron Matros (second CEO); Don Zereski (third CEO); George C. McNamee; András Kornai (Chief Scientist)
- Products: geographic information retrieval; OpenLayers
- Website: www.metacarta.com

MetaCarta is a software company that developed one of the first search engines to use a map to find unstructured documents. The product uses natural language processing to georeference text for customers in defense, intelligence, homeland security, law enforcement, oil and gas companies, and publishing. The company was founded in 1999 and was acquired by Nokia in 2010. Nokia subsequently spun out the enterprise products division and the MetaCarta brand to Qbase, now renamed to Finch.

== History ==
=== Financing ===
MetaCarta was founded in 1999 by John R. Frank while he was working on his Ph.D. in physics as a Hertz Fellow at the Massachusetts Institute of Technology. By early 2001, John and Erik Rauch had developed a prototype of the Geographic Text Search product and incorporated the company together with Doug Brenhouse. In July 2001, they received $500,000 from DARPA’s Next Generation Internet Program. In 2001 and 2002, angel investors, including Esther Dyson, Bob Frankston, David P. Reed and Pattie Maes invested.

In October 2002, CIA’s venture capital arm In-Q-Tel invested and Gilman Louie, CEO of In-Q-Tel, said "there is tremendous interest and value in this type of geospatial information service and MetaCarta is the first company in this space in which we have invested." In-Q-Tel invested a second time in 2004.

In December 2003, the company raised a $6.5M Series B from a syndicate led by Sevin Rosen. Sevin Rosen espoused an investment philosophy of frugality but required a controlling interest, and the decision to accept that investment has become the subject of a business school case study. Sevin Rosen’s cofounder Ben Rosen has historical ties to Esther Dyson, and had invested in Bob Frankston’s company VisiCorp in the late 1970s. The syndicate included the venture capital arm of Chevron Texaco. In 2005, the company raised a Series C of $10 million led by FA Tech. Between 2006 and 2009, one member of the Series B syndicate went into receivership and the syndicate’s lead investor Sevin Rosen had an internal schism that eventually led it to split up. This forced the Sevin Rosen leader for the MetaCarta deal to depart.

=== Oil & Gas ===
In 2007, the company launched a product for the energy sector in partnership with IHS, and Schlumberger acquired exclusive distribution rights in the petroleum industry. The company partnered with content providers like the Society of Petroleum Engineers to support upstream exploration use cases.

=== Acquisition ===
Nokia acquired MetaCarta on April 9, 2010, a few months after the company reported record revenue growth. Nokia kept MetaCarta's core engineering team to build the search engine behind its HERE.com location search offering, and spun-out the enterprise products division and MetaCarta brand to Qbase Holdings in July, 2010. In 2012, John Frank left the role of Chief Architect for Search at Nokia to found Diffeo. Don Zereski, the CEO of MetaCarta at the time of its acquisition by Nokia became VP of Search and Discovery at HERE and led acquisitions of other startups. Qbase re-launched MetaCarta as part of Synthos Technologies, now Finch, naming Erin-Michael Gill, CEO in September 2014.

== Products and services ==
MetaCarta offers multiple products based on its georeferencing and geoindexing technology, called CartaTrees. Its first product was an enterprise search tool that allowed users to combine keyword and map-based filters to retrieve documents. It was called Geographic Text Search (GTS) and was later renamed to Geographic Search and Referencing Platform (GSRP). The GTS was packaged as server appliance and used by enterprise customers that often cannot use cloud services, such as the British Transport Police for the 2012 Olympics. For oil & gas customers, the GTS was branded as "geOdrive".

The company also offered Internet-based services built on its technology, including map displays of news stories filtered by location. Microsoft Vine, National Geographic, and other publishers have used these services.

The company's georeferencing or geoparsing engine includes gazetteer databases of millions of place names in special knowledge domains, such as petroleum, and languages, including English, Arabic, and Spanish. The system uses machine learning to disambiguate the semantics of mentions of places in natural language text.

=== MetaCarta Labs ===
In addition to its commercial products, its lab website labs.metacarta.com launched a number of geoweb, neogeography, and open source software projects that gained notoriety through O'Reilly’s Where 2.0 conferences, including Gutenkarte.org, TileCache, FeatureServer, and OpenLayers, now a project in Open Source Geospatial Foundation. MetaCarta Labs also showcased integrations with Silverlight, SharePoint, Flickr, Firefox, and a map rectifier. Shortly before being acquired, MetaCarta granted the source code for its enterprise content crawler to the Apache Foundation to create the Apache Manifold Connector Framework (ManifoldCF)

== Awards ==
- 2006 - KMWorld's List of 100 Companies That Matter in Knowledge Management
- 2005 - Red Herring Top Innovator
- 2004 - Red Herring Top 100 Private Companies
- IndustryWeek Technologies of the Year
- 2-time KMWorld Trend-Setting Products

== See also ==
- Erik Rauch – company co-founder (May 15, 1974 – July 13, 2005)
- Schuyler Erle
- András Kornai – former Chief Scientist
- Hertz Foundation
- OpenLayers
