= Mariana Dahan =

Mariana Dahan is a human rights activist, documentary filmmaker, and writer on the use of technology for human advancement. She is the CEO and founder of the World Identity Network, a non-profit promoting universal identity, as well as the Chair of the Universal ID Council.

== Early life and education ==
Dahan is a French citizen, but she was born and spent her childhood in the Soviet Union, on the border with the current territory of Ukraine. She has cited her upbringing as the driving motivation for her work promoting universal identity.

Dahan won several national competitions for French language and literature, which afforded her a scholarship to study in France and obtain citizenship. She first graduated from the Universite Paris-Dauphine with a master's degree in marketing and strategy and later earned two PhDs in management and economic sciences from Paris II and the ESCP Business School. While working on her PhD thesis, Dahan was invited as a visiting researcher to the MIT Sloan School of Management, spending a year within the System Dynamics Group led by Professor John Sterman. Both Professor Hazhir Rahmandad and Professor Damon Centola from MIT were on her PhD defense committee.

In 2011 she graduated from the Harvard Kennedy School Executive Program she pursued after taking maternity leave.

== Career ==
Dahan began her career in 1998, working and consulting for mobile operators Orange and Vodafone in developed and developing countries.

Dahan joined the World Bank in 2009. In 2014, she launched the World Bank's Identification for Development (ID4D), an initiative that researches and funds digital identification programs. She was later promoted to the World Bank Senior Vice Presidency Office in charge of the Sustainable Development Goals agenda and the United Nations' relations and partnerships.

Dahan founded the non-governmental nonprofit organization World Identity Network (WIN) Foundation in 2017. The initiative was launched on Richard Branson's Necker Island during the annual Blockchain Summit. Shortly after its launch, WIN Foundation partnered with the United Nations on the pilot program “Blockchain for Humanity” to use blockchain technology to help fight child trafficking. WIN Foundation's work has been endorsed by actress Amber Heard, who has also helped promote the "Shadows in the Dark" documentary movie on Dahan's efforts to provide vulnerable populations with a proof of identity.

Dahan is a founding member of the Global Blockchain Business Council (GBBC) and a former blockchain fellow at the Washington, D.C.–based thinktank New America. In 2019, she was appointed as Identity Management Faculty at the Singularity University In 2020, Dahan became an Expert Member at the United Nations Department for Economic and Social Affairs.

== Philanthropy and charity work ==
Dahan was appointed Ambassador to the United Nations Global Goal 16 on identity, along with Amber Heard, during a ceremony organized by the #Togetherband campaign on the margins of the UNGA 2019. She is also a Global Ambassador for the UK-based nonprofit Hope and Homes for Children and CCF Moldova.

== Publications ==
- Quenching the Thirst for Innovation: Modeling the Diffusion of Mobile Technologies (2015, Scholars’ Press).

== Filmography ==
- "Shadows in the Dark: Our Global Identity Crisis", documentary movie.

== Controversy ==
Dahan, who has openly supported Amber Heard during her trial against her ex-husband Johnny Depp, called out the high-profile stars who failed to come out in support for Heard at the time.

"Women should stand up for each other, especially other survivors of abuse. But there were no brownie points in endorsing someone like Amber, and I think people are now more cautious about how doing so could hurt their careers."

"Women like Vanessa Paradis and Winona Ryder [Depp's exes, who said he had never been violent towards them] ought to have more compassion for what Amber went through. They lacked solidarity."
