= Schuyler Erle =

Schuyler Erle is a free software developer and activist. He also works in the fields of digital cartography, wireless networking, intelligent search engines and the Semantic Web. He was the lead developer of NoCatAuth which is an open source Wireless captive portal. Erle grew up in Philadelphia and Springfield, PA and after graduating from Springfield High School in 1995, went on to earn his degree at Temple University. He has created the popular games Balance of Power and Squigby.

Schuyler has worked for O'Reilly Media, MetaCarta (where he and Chris Schmidt created OpenLayers), and worked for SimpleGeo until their merger with UrbanAirship.

He joined Amateur Radio Digital Communications as Director of Technology in October 2024.

== Bibliography ==
- Schuyler Erle, Rich Gibson and Jo Walsh (2005). Mapping Hacks. O'Reilly. ISBN 0-596-00703-5.
- Schuyler Erle and Rich Gibson (January 2006). Google Maps Hacks. O'Reilly. ISBN 0-596-10161-9.
