= Geographic information retrieval =

Technologies for discovering content about a place

Geographic information retrieval (GIR) or geographical information retrieval systems are search tools for searching the Web, enterprise documents, and mobile local search that combine traditional text-based queries with location querying, such as a map or placenames. Like traditional information retrieval systems, GIR systems index text and information from structured and unstructured documents, and also augment those indices with geographic information. The development and engineering of GIR systems aims to build systems that can reliably answer queries that include a geographic dimension, such as "What wars were fought in Greece?" or "restaurants in Beirut". Semantic similarity and word-sense disambiguation are important components of GIR. To identify place names, GIR systems often rely on natural language processing or other metadata to associate text documents with locations. Such georeferencing, geotagging, and geoparsing tools often need databases of location names, known as gazetteers.

== GIR architecture ==
GIR involves extracting and resolving the meaning of locations in unstructured text. This is known as geoparsing. After identifying mentions of places and locations in text, a GIR system indexes this information for search and retrieval. GIR systems can commonly be broken down into the following stages: geoparsing, text and geographic indexing, data storage, geographic relevance ranking with respect to a geographic query and browsing results commonly with a map interface.

Some GIR systems separate text indexing from geographic indexing, which enables the use of generic database joins, or multi-stage filtering, and others combine them for efficiency.

GIR must manage several forms of uncertainty, including semantic ambiguity of mentions of places in natural language text and position precision.

== GIR systems ==
- MetaCarta created and patented one of the first commercial products to offer GIR capabilities.
- Frankenplace: a general-purpose geographic search engine.
- Web-a-where

== Study & Evaluation ==
The study of GIR systems has a rich history dating back to the 1970s and possibly earlier. See Ray Larson's book Geographic information retrieval and spatial browsing for references to much of the pre-Web literature on GIR.

In 2005 the Cross-Language Evaluation Forum added a geographic track, GeoCLEF. GeoCLEF was the first TREC-style evaluation forum for GIR systems and provided participants a chance to compare systems.

== Applications ==
GIR has many applications in geoweb, neogeography, and mobile local search and has been a focus of many conferences, including the ESRI Users Conferences and O'Reilly's Where 2.0 conferences.

== See also ==
- Geographic information system
- Geoparsing
- Information retrieval
- MetaCarta
- Semantic similarity
- Search engine (computing)
- Toponymy
