= Erik Rauch =

American ecologist and entrepreneur

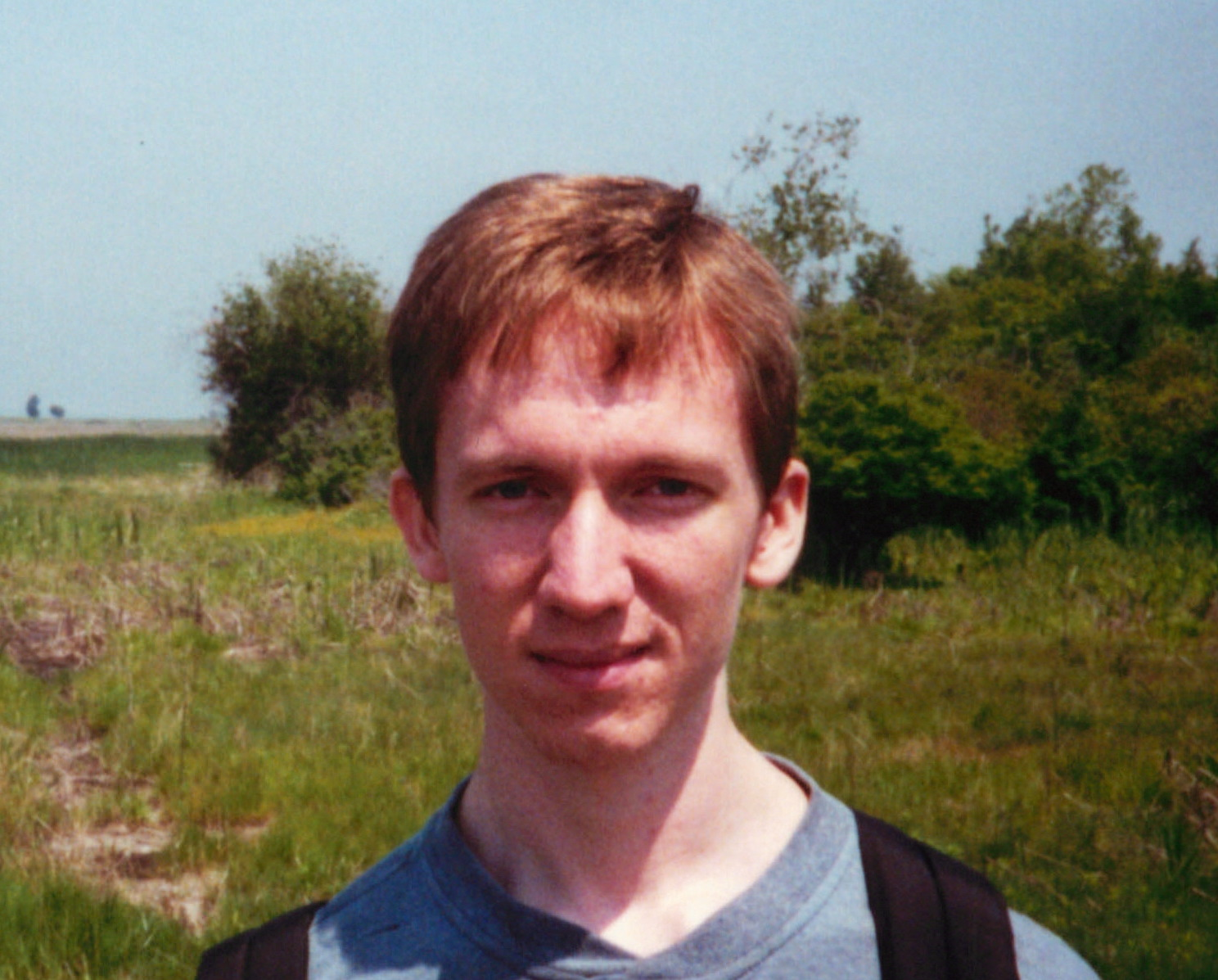
- Born: Erik Rauch; May 15, 1974
- Died: July 13, 2005 (aged 31); California's Sequoia National Park; United States
- Education: Massachusetts Institute of Technology, Ph.D. Stanford University; Yale University, B.S. in Computer Science and Mathematics
- Occupations: Biophysicist and theoretical ecologist
- Employer(s): NECSI; MIT; Santa Fe Institute; Yale University; IBM; Department of Ecology and Evolutionary Biology at Princeton University
- Known for: Founder of MetaCarta, ALife, TerraShare

Erik Rauch (May 15, 1974 – July 13, 2005) was an American biophysicist and theoretical ecologist who worked at NECSI, MIT, Santa Fe Institute, Yale University, Princeton University, and other institutions. Rauch's most notable paper was published in Nature and concerned the mathematical modeling of the conservation of biodiversity.

== Biography ==
He received a B.S. in Computer Science and Mathematics from Yale University in May 1996, where he was the technician for campus humor magazine The Yale Record. His undergraduate thesis was "The Geometry of Critical Ising Clusters", under the direction of Benoit Mandelbrot, the inventor of fractal geometry. He then worked at the IBM Watson Research Center in the theoretical physics department, and began graduate study at Stanford University in 1996.

He received his PhD from the Massachusetts Institute of Technology in 2004 under the direction of Gerald Sussman: his thesis topic was " Diversity of Evolving Systems: Scaling and Dynamics of Genealogical Trees "

He then joined the Department of Ecology and Evolutionary Biology at Princeton University as a postdoctoral fellow in the group of Simon A. Levin, the Moffett professor of biology in 2005, and was in that position at his early death.

His hobby of collecting place names led Rauch to found MetaCarta with John Frank and Doug Brenhouse. Using MetaCarta's software, Rauch developed maps like the four below for fun. Rauch was an inventor of spatial information processing systems.

He founded several organizations, including

- ALife
- TerraShare
- MetaCarta

He proposed an approach for car-free neighborhoods to the zoning board of Cambridge, Massachusetts.

He died in a hiking accident in California's Sequoia National Park at age 31.

== Published works related to biological diversity ==
- Erik M. Rauch; Yaneer Bar-Yam (2006). "Long-range interactions and evolutionary stability in a predator-prey system". Physical Review E. 73 (2) 020903. Bibcode:2006PhRvE..73b0903R. doi:10.1103/physreve.73.020903. PMID 16605322.
- Rauch, E.M. and Yaneer Bar-Yam (2005). "Estimating the total genetic diversity of a spatial field population from a sample and implications of its dependence on habitat area". Proceedings of the National Academy of Sciences of the United States of America. 102 (28): 9826–9829. Bibcode:2005PNAS..102.9826R. doi:10.1073/pnas.0408471102. PMC 1174974. PMID 15998741.
- Erik M. Rauch; Yaneer Bar-Yam (2004). "Theory predicts the uneven distribution of genetic diversity within species". Nature. 431 (7007): 449–452. Bibcode:2004Natur.431..449R. doi:10.1038/nature02745. PMID 15386012. S2CID 8741496.
- Erik M. Rauch H. Sayama and Yaneer Bar-Yam (2004). "Dynamics and genealogy of strains in spatially extended host-pathogen models" (PDF). Journal of Statistical Physics. 114 (5–6): 1417–1451. Bibcode:2004JSP...114.1417D. doi:10.1023/B:JOSS.0000013958.15218.47. S2CID 4024699.
- Rauch, E.M.; Millonas, M.M. (2004). "The role of trans-membrane signal transduction in Turing-type cellular pattern formation". Journal of Theoretical Biology. 226 (4): 401–407. doi:10.1016/j.jtbi.2003.09.018. PMID 14759646.
- De Aguiar, M.A.M.; Rauch, E.M.; Bar-Yam, Y. (2003). "Mean-field approximation to a spatial host-pathogen model". Physical Review E. 67 (47102): 471021–471024. arXiv:1307.5335. Bibcode:2003PhRvE..67d7102D. doi:10.1103/physreve.67.047102. PMID 12786532. S2CID 16674107.
- Rauch, E. (2003). "Discrete, Amorphous Physical Models". International Journal of Theoretical Physics. 42 (2): 329–348. doi:10.1023/A:1024455602163. S2CID 11796646.
- Rauch, E.M.; Sayama, H.; Bar-Yam, Y. (2002). "Relationship between measures of fitness and time scale in evolution". Physical Review Letters. 88 (22): 228101/1–228101/4. Bibcode:2002PhRvL..88v8101R. doi:10.1103/PhysRevLett.88.228101. PMID 12059453.
- Berz, G.; Kron, W.; Loster, T.; Rauch, E.; Schimetschek, J.; Schmieder, J.; Siebert, A.; Smolka, A.; Wirtz, A. (2001). "World map of natural hazards - a global view of the distribution and intensity of significant exposures". Natural Hazards. 23 (2–3): 443–465. doi:10.1023/A:1011193724026. S2CID 128879105.

== Gallery ==
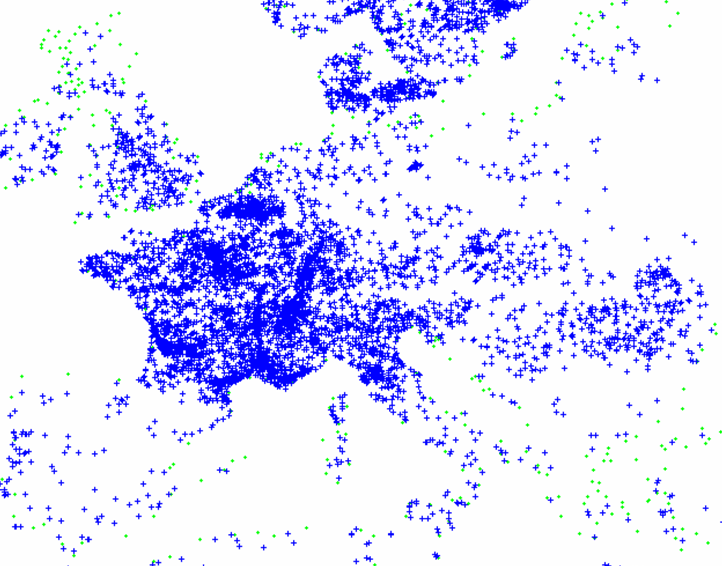
MetaCarta query for "vin" shows the outline of France

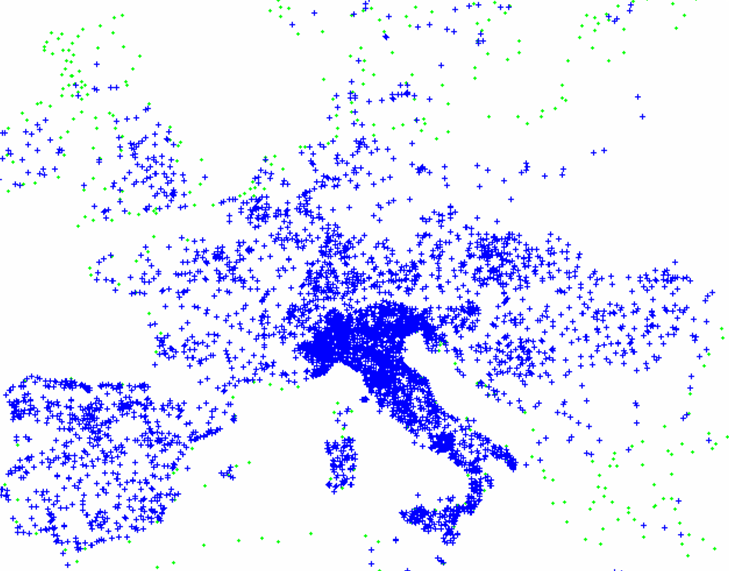
MetaCarta query for "vino" shows the outline of Italy

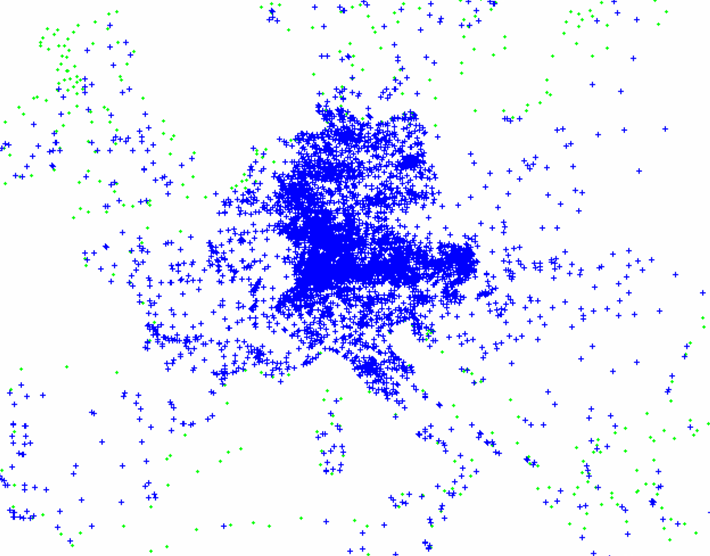
MetaCarta query for "wein" shows the outline of Germany

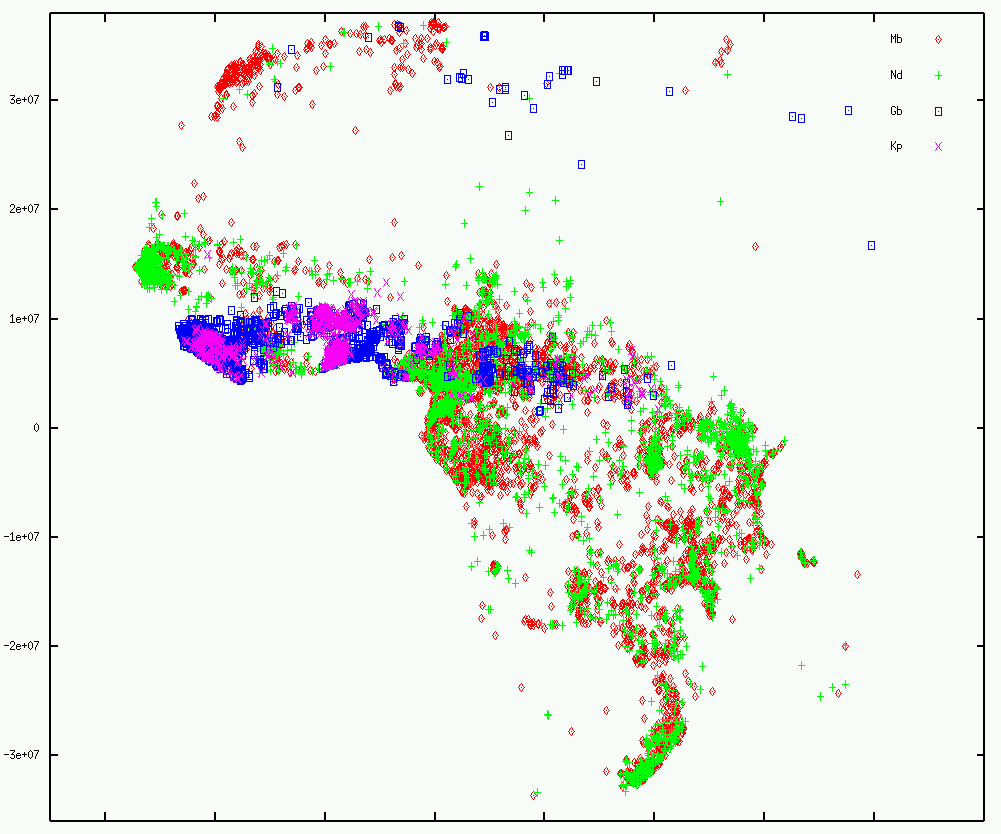
Scatter plot of consonant pairings in place names showing the distribution of linguistic influences
