= Geoweb =

== History ==
The concept of a Geospatial Web was first introduced by Dr. Charles Herring in his US DoD paper, An Architecture of Cyberspace: Spatialization of the Internet, 1994, U.S. Army Construction Engineering Research Laboratory. Dr. Herring proposed that the problem of defining the physical domain in a computer or cyber-infrastructure, providing real time and appropriate fidelity, required a cyber-spatial reference or index combining both Internet Addressing and Hierarchical Spatial Addressing.

The Geoweb is characterized by the self synchronization of network addressing, time, and location. The Geoweb allows location to be used to self organize all geospatially referenced data available through the Internet. The interest in a Geoweb has been advanced by new technologies, concepts, and products, specifically the popularization of GPS positioning with the introduction of smart phones.

Virtual globes such as Google Earth and NASA World Wind as well as mapping websites such as Google Maps, Live Search Maps, Yahoo Maps, and OpenStreetMap have been major factors in raising awareness towards the importance of geography and location as a means to index information.

The increase in advanced web development methods such as Ajax is inspiring to move GIS (Geographical Information Systems) into the web.

Geographic Information Retrieval (GIR) has emerged as an academic community interested in technical aspects of helping people find information about places. To make information accessible from geographically oriented applications, coordinate metadata must be created via some form of geocoding or geoparsing process. After obtaining geographic coordinates, they must be indexed in useful ways that allow people to interact with the non-geographic nature of the content, e.g. viewing photographs or keyword searching.

The semi-annual Geoweb Summits in New York have covered the emerging geoweb industry since 2010, connecting GIS and mobile LBS with Internet of things and augmented reality.

== Related references ==
- Papadimitriou, Fivos (April 15, 2010). "Introduction to the complex Geospatial Web in geographical education". International Research in Geographical and Environmental Education. 19 (1): 53–56. Bibcode:2010IRGEE..19...53P. doi:10.1080/10382041003602928. ISSN 1038-2046.

== See also ==
- Digital Earth
- Search engine
- Geospatial Content Management System (GeoCMS)
- Geographic Information Retrieval
- Geocoding and Geoparsing
- Web mapping
