= Hazhir Rahmandad =

Iranian American Scientist and Engineer

- Born: Tehran, Iran
- Education: Sharif University of Technology; Massachusetts Institute of Technology
- Awards: Gold Medal International Chemistry Olympiad, Moscow (1996)
- Scientific career
- Fields: Systems Engineering, Management, Organizational Behavior
- Workplaces: Virginia Tech; MIT Sloan School of Management
- Doctoral advisor: John Sterman

Hazhir Rahmandad (Persian: هژیر رحمانداد) is an Iranian American Scientist and Engineer. Dr. Rahmandad is a dynamic modeling expert. His research applies dynamic modeling to a broad range of problems in strategy, organizational learning, and public health.

== Education ==
Rahmandad obtained his B.Sc. in Industrial Engineering from Sharif University of Technology. He holds a Ph.D. from Massachusetts Institute of Technology (2005), where he worked under the supervision of John Sterman.

== Career ==
Rahmandad is currently the Schussel Family Professor of Management Science and a Professor of System Dynamics at the MIT Sloan School of Management where he teaches simulation modeling and system dynamics.

Before joining MIT, Rahmandad was an Associate Professor of Industrial and Systems Engineering in the College of Engineering at Virginia Tech. Hazhir also contributes to expanding the system dynamics modeling toolbox through advancing parameter estimation and validation methods for dynamic models. He has published in diverse journals including Management Science, Organization Science, Strategic Management Journal, PlosOne, Epidemiology and Infection, International Journal of Obesity, and System Dynamics Review among others. He has been a reviewer for over 20 NIH and NSF panels and over two dozen different journals, and his research has been funded by the National Science Foundation, National Institutes of Health, Department of Housing and Urban Development, and multiple private sector firms, among others.

== Awards and honors ==
Gold Medal, International Chemistry Olympiad, Moscow (1996)
