= András Kornai =

Hungarian mathematical linguist

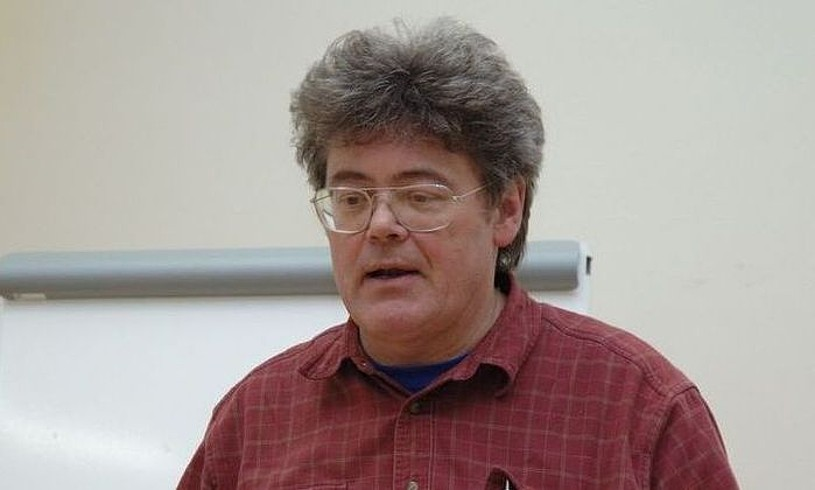
Kornai in 2018

András Kornai (born 1957 in Budapest) is a mathematical linguist.

== Education ==
Kornai is the son of economist János Kornai. He earned two PhDs with the first being in mathematics in 1983 from Eötvös Loránd University in Budapest, where his advisor was Miklós Ajtai. His second was in linguistics in 1991 from Stanford University, where his advisor was Paul Kiparsky.

== Career ==
He is a professor in the Department of Algebra at the Budapest Institute of Technology, where he works on an open source Hungarian morphological analyzer. He was Chief Scientist at MetaCarta, where he worked on information extraction before the company was acquired by Nokia. Prior to MetaCarta, he was Chief Scientist at Northern Light.

He is on the board of the journal Grammars and YourAmigo PLC. His research interests include all mathematical aspects of natural language processing, speech recognition, and OCR.

As area editor he was responsible for the Mathematical Linguistics area of the Oxford International Encyclopedia of Linguistics, and his joint work with Geoffrey Pullum, "The X-bar Theory of Phrase Structure", formally reconstructed that then-popular linguistic theory.

== Awards and honors ==
- 2009: ACM Distinguished Member

== Monographs ==
- Semantics. Springer Nature, 2020. ISBN 978-3-319-65644-1
- Mathematical Linguistics. Springer Verlag, in the series Advanced Information and Knowledge Processing, November 2007. ISBN 978-1-84628-985-9 Hardbound, approximately 300 pages. See description.
- Formal Phonology. In the series Outstanding Dissertations in Linguistics, Garland Publishing, 1994, ISBN 0-8153-1730-1, hardbound, 240 pages Contents, Preface, Introduction (20 pages)
- On Hungarian Morphology. In the series Linguistica, Hungarian Academy of Sciences, 1994, ISBN 963-8461-73-X, paperbound, 174 pages Contents, Preface, Introduction (10 pages)

== Books edited ==
- Oxford International Encyclopedia of Linguistics (Mathematical Linguistics Area Editor under Editor in Chief William Frawley). 4 volumes, Oxford University Press, 2003, ISBN 978-0-19-513977-8.
- Proceedings of the HLT-NAACL Workshop on the Analysis of Geographic References. Jointly with Beth Sundheim. Association for Computational Linguistics, 2003, ISBN 1-932432-04-3 (WS9), paperbound, vi+81 pages. See related material.
- Extended Finite State Models of Language (editor). In the series Studies in Natural Language Processing, Cambridge University Press, 1999, ISBN 0-521-63198-X, hardbound, x+278 pages Contents, Introduction (7 pages).

== Selected papers ==
- Digital Language Death. PLoS ONE 8(10): e77056, 2012.
- Hunmorph: open source word analysis (Jointly with V. Tron, Gy. Gyepesi, P. Halacsy, L. Nemeth, and D. Varga). In Proc. ACL 2005 Software Workshop 77-85
- Leveraging the open source ispell codebase for minority language analysis (Jointly with P. Halacsy, L. Nemeth, A. Rung, I. Szakadat, and V. Tron). In J. Carson-Berndsen (ed): Proc. SALTMIL 2004 56-59
- Explicit Finitism, International Journal of Theoretical Physics 2003/2 301-307
- Mathematical Linguistics (Jointly with G.K. Pullum) In W. Frawley (ed): Oxford International Encyclopedia of Linguistics, Oxford University Press 2003, v3 17-20
- Optical Character Recognition, In W. Frawley (ed): Oxford International Encyclopedia of Linguistics, Oxford University Press 2003, v3 33-34
- How many words are there? Glottometrics 2002/4 61-86
- Zipf's law outside the middle range Proc. Sixth Meeting on Mathematics of Language University of Central Florida, 1999 347-356
- A Robust, Language-Independent OCR System. (Jointly with Z. Lu, I. Bazzi, J. Makhoul, P. Natarajan, and R. Schwartz) In: Robert J. Mericsko (ed): Proc. 27th AIPR Workshop: Advances in Computer-Assisted Recognition SPIE Proceedings 3584 1999
- Quantitative Comparison of Languages. Grammars 1998/2 155-165
- The generative power of feature geometry. Annals of Mathematics and Artificial Intelligence 8 1993 37-46
- The X-bar Theory of Phrase Structure. (Jointly with G.K. Pullum) Language 66 1990 24-50
