= Business Dynamics =

2000 book by John Sterman

- Author: John Sterman
- Language: English
- Publisher: McGraw Hill
- Publication date: 2000
- ISBN: 0-07-231135-5
- OCLC: 42771322
- Dewey Decimal: 658.4/038/011 21
- LC Class: HD30.2 .S7835 2000

Business Dynamics is a book by John Sterman that applies system dynamics to business.

The book introduces systems dynamics modeling for the analysis of policy and strategy, with an emphasis on business and public policy applications. System dynamics is both a conceptual tool and a powerful modeling method. This allows the building of computer simulations of complex systems. These simulations can then be used to test the effectiveness of different policies on business outcomes.
