= Yaneer Bar-Yam =

American scientist and activist

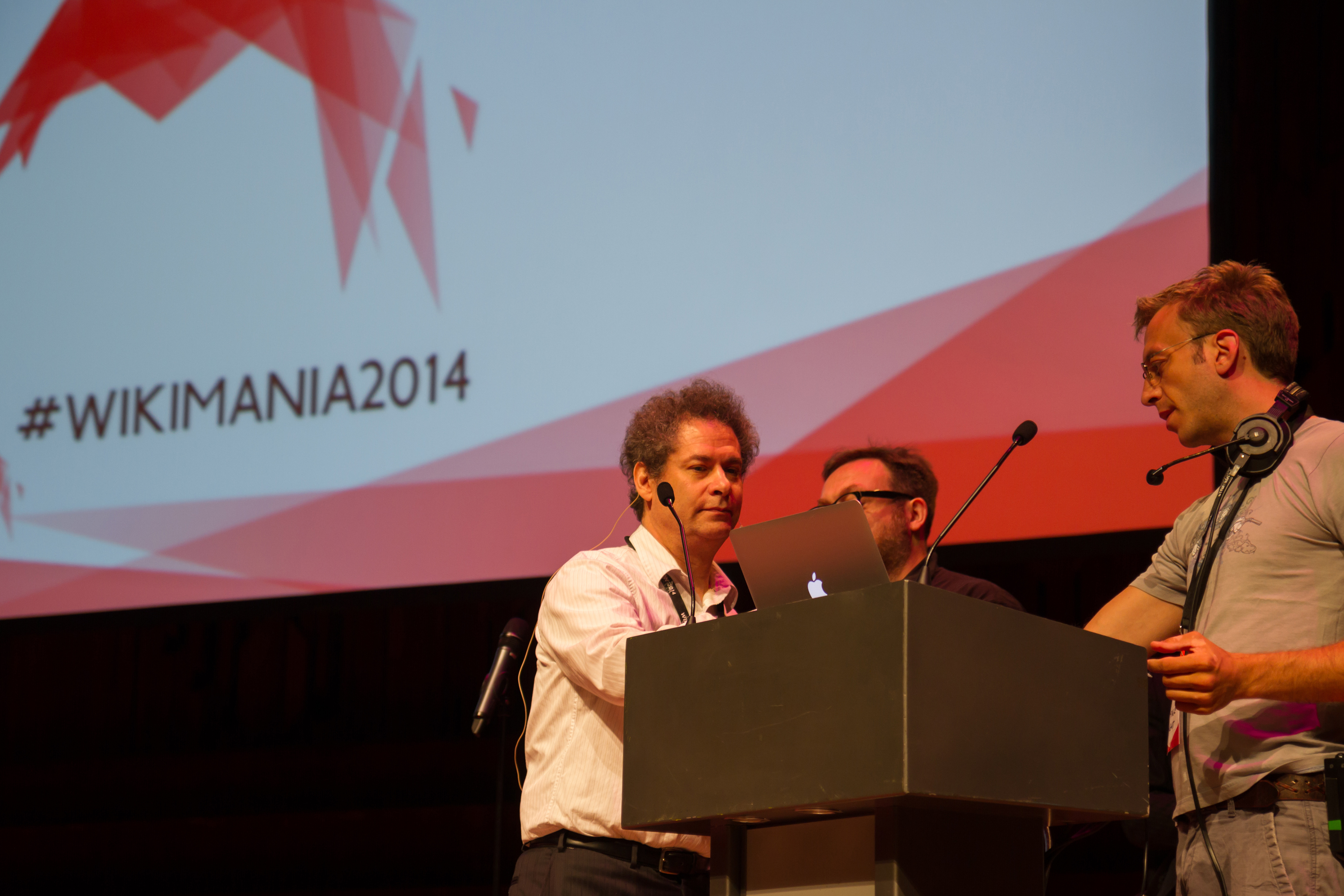
- Bar-Yam (on the left) at Wikimania 2014
- Born: 1959 (age 66–67); Boston, Massachusetts
- Education: Massachusetts Institute of Technology (BS, PhD)
- Scientific career
- Fields: Complex systems (Application to social, biological and physical systems)
- Institutions: New England Complex Systems Institute (NECSI) (1997-today); Boston University (1991-1997)
- Thesis: Microscopic Theory of the Dynamics of Defects in Semiconductors. (1984)
- Doctoral advisor: John Dimitris Joannopoulos
- Doctoral students: Erik Rauch
- Website: necsi.edu/faculty/bar-yam.html

Yaneer Bar-Yam (born 1959) is an American scientist and activist specializing in complex systems. An expert in the quantitative analysis of pandemics, he advised policy makers on the Western African Ebola virus epidemic and founded EndCoronavirus.org, a global network of several volunteers formed in February 2020 to provide information, guidelines, and policy advocacy to fight the COVID-19 pandemic. He is the founding president of the New England Complex Systems Institute (NECSI), an independent research institution that studies complex systems science and its real-world applications.

== Biography ==
Yaneer Bar-Yam was born in Boston, Massachusetts, in 1959 to Israeli parents. His father, Zvi Bar-Yam, is a high-energy particle physicist, and his mother, Miriam Bar-Yam, is a developmental psychologist. He received his BS degree in 1978 and his Ph.D. degree in 1984, both in physics from the Massachusetts Institute of Technology. He was a Bantrell Postdoctoral Fellow, and a joint postdoctoral fellow at MIT and IBM. In 1991, following a junior faculty appointment at the Weizmann Institute of Science, he was appointed an associate professor of engineering at Boston University. He left Boston University in 1997 to become the founding president of the New England Complex Systems Institute, a position he holds as of May 2020.

Bar-Yam was a visiting scholar at the Department of Molecular and Cellular Biology at Harvard University and the Federal Reserve Bank of Boston. He was chairman of the International Conference on Complex Systems, an annual forum dedicated to bridging the domains of complexity science and real-world systems, and is the managing editor of InterJournal, a NECSI publication on selected topics in science and engineering.

Bar-Yam is currently a research scientist at the MIT Media Lab, and is the managing editor of the Springer book series on complexity.

== Ideas and Theories ==
The NECSI website defined "complex systems" as systems that "have multiple interacting components whose collective behavior cannot be simply inferred from the behavior of components." Bar-Yam is considered a contributor to the founding of the field of complex systems science, having introduced fundamental rigor, real-world applications, and educational programs to the field.

Bar-Yam studies the unified properties of complex systems as a systematic strategy for answering basic questions about the world. His research is focused both on formalizing complex systems concepts and relating them to everyday problems. In particular, he studies the relationship between observations at different scales, formal properties of descriptions of systems, the relationship of structure and function, the representation of information as a physical quantity, and quantitative properties of the complexity of real systems. Applications have been to physical, biological, and social systems.

His recent work analyzes the origins and impacts of market crashes, social unrest, ethnic violence, military conflict and pandemics, the structure and dynamics of social networks, and the bases of creativity, panic, evolution, and altruism. Bar-Yam has made further contributions to the theory of the structural and electronic dynamics of materials, the theory of polymer dynamics and protein folding, the theory of neural networks and structure-function relationships, the theory of quantitative multiscale complexity, and the theory of evolution. His development of multiscale representations as a generalization of renormalization group addressed the limitations of calculus and statistics in the study of nonlinear and network system dependencies on collective behaviors.

== Work ==
=== NECSI ===
Bar-Yam is the president of Cambridge, Massachusetts-based NECSI, an independent research institution and think tank dedicated to the study of complex systems and its applications to solving real-world problems. NECSI was established by faculty members of various New England academic institutions, including MIT, Harvard, Brandeis, and others, to encourage collaboration among researchers. In addition to its in-house research team, NECSI has co-faculty, students, and affiliates from universities around the world. NECSI also conducts classes, seminars, and conferences to assist students, faculty, and professionals in their understanding of complex systems. NECSI's faculty, co-faculty, and affiliates represent a wide range of scientific disciplines, and have included Jerome Kagan, Thomas Schelling, and Nassim Nicholas Taleb. NECSI researchers have contributed to such varied areas as networks, social systems, food crises, and economic systems.

In February 2020, NECSI and Bar-Yam established EndCoronavirus.org to offer information, guidelines, and policy advocacy to fight the COVID-19 pandemic.

=== Consulting and advisory ===
Bar-Yam has advised many policymaking and regulatory bodies on various topics, including: the Pentagon's Chairman Action Group on global social unrest and the crises in Egypt and Syria; the National Security Council and the National Counter Terrorism Council on global strategy; the Chief of Naval Operations Strategic Studies Group on military force transformation; the Centers for Disease Control and Prevention on delivery of prevention services and control of hospital infections; Congressman Barney Frank (as chairman of the House Financial Services Committee) on market regulation and the 2008 financial crisis. He has given 175 invited presentations, and has taught the concepts and methods of complex systems science to over 2,000 graduate students, professionals, and executives.

== Pandemics Research and Activism ==
=== Overview ===
Pandemics are a natural field of study for complex systems scientists, as many of the main insights of the discipline—including network theory, nonlinearity, chaos, emergent properties, adaptation, and non-ergodicity—can be directly brought to bear on the analysis of infectious diseases and their spread.

Bar-Yam has studied pandemics since the early 2000s, in concert with NECSI's stated mission to foster collaboration among different disciplines (e.g. mathematics and epidemiology) and to apply theoretical work to problems in the real world. His research has emphasized the role of increasing global travel in pandemics; community monitoring of symptoms as potentially superior to conventional testing, tracking, and tracing techniques; and specific guidelines for individuals, policymakers, healthcare workers, and businesses to slow the spread of infectious diseases.

Bar-Yam's early research on pandemics identified the fatality rate of an infectious disease as a key limiting factor in its ability to spread. For the deadliest diseases, he argued that the pathogen would rapidly exhaust the local supply of hosts to infect, and would therefore disappear before it could spread beyond the initial local area of outbreak.

In a 2006 paper co-authored with Erik Rauch, Bar-Yam introduced global travel (e.g. international long-distance flights and overseas shipment of livestock) as a new variable to his earlier pandemic models, which yielded a nonlinear relationship between the amount of global travel and the ultimate severity of an outbreak. Specifically, the authors found that up to a certain point, increasing global travel had little impact on the overall severity of an outbreak. However, when the amount of travel approached a critical threshold, the ultimate severity of the outbreak (and its likelihood of becoming a global pandemic) increased suddenly and sharply. "Due to increasing global travel," Bar-Yam and Rauch wrote in the 2006 paper, "human beings may cross the transition into the realm of pandemics unless preventive actions are taken that either limit global transportation or its impact."

=== Ebola ===
During the Western African Ebola virus epidemic which began in 2013, Bar-Yam advocated in favor of curtailing transportation from West Africa, arguing that even in cases where significant interconnectivity between populations already existed, even a small amount of additional interconnectivity could dramatically increase the severity of an outbreak.

Bar-Yam also advocated in favor of community monitoring to fight the Ebola epidemic. The conventional response to infectious disease outbreaks emphasizes individual contact tracing, i.e. the effort to locate all individuals who were in contact with an individual known to carry the disease. Bar-Yam argued that it would be more effective and efficient to monitor local communities (defined as a natural population unit to and from which transportation can be logically curtailed) as a whole—in other words, to treat an entire community as "infected" once one individual in that community is infected, and then intensively screen that community for additional cases while instituting local transportation restrictions. This type of community response would progressively limit the disease to smaller geographical areas, Bar-Yam argued, while improving the allocation of resources. Bar-Yam argued that community monitoring played a significant role in halting the Ebola epidemic in Liberia.

=== COVID-19 ===
On January 26, 2020, one week after the first case of COVID-19 disease in the United States was reported, Bar-Yam co-authored a note with Nassim Nicholas Taleb and Joseph Norman. The note outlined several principles in connection with the novel coronavirus outbreak, and argued that policy responses should follow a precautionary approach, including drastically constraining human mobility patterns as soon and as swiftly as possible.

On February 29, 2020, Bar-Yam and NECSI established EndCoronavirus.org, a global volunteer network, to provide information and guidelines for action to fight the COVID-19 pandemic. EndCoronavirus.org was among the first organizations in the United States to offer specific guidelines for policymakers, businesses, and individuals. As of May 2020, EndCoronavirus.org had over 4,000 volunteers.

On March 13, 2020, the "Coronavirus Guidelines for Businesses" written by EndCoronavirus.org were adopted by the International Chamber of Commerce, the global business organization representing over 45 million members in over 100 countries.

On March 21, 2020, USA Today published an opinion piece by Bar-Yam, in which he argued for an immediate five-week lockdown in the entire United States to defeat COVID-19.

On April 5, 2020, Bar-Yam and Chen Shen published a paper titled "COVID-19: How to Win," which summarized his recommendations. Those recommendations included a lockdown, separate quarantine facilities for mild and moderate COVID-19 cases to prevent transmission within households, mask wearing in shared spaces, travel restrictions, improved safety of essential services, increased testing, health guidelines to prevent mild cases from becoming severe, and increased support for hospitals and healthcare workers.

On April 15, 2020, Bar-Yam reported via Twitter that he was assisting the government of Kosovo in its efforts to fight the COVID-19 pandemic.

On April 28, 2020, Bar-Yam was consulted by Virginia residents on an open letter to Ralph Northam, the governor of Virginia, calling for more aggressive action to fight COVID-19 in that state. The letter was signed by 430 scientists, doctors, and citizens as of May 25, 2020.

On May 12, 2020, CNN.com published an opinion piece by Bar-Yam, in which he argued against the premature opening of states, and urged individual citizens to continue strict restrictions on their movement and contact with others.

On November 26, 2021, Bar-Yam suggested solely on the basis of a simple linear extrapolation that the omicron variant might have eight times the fatality rate of the wild-type virus.

== Publications ==
Bar-Yam is the author and/or editor of several books, as well as the author of more than 200 research papers in professional journals, including in Science, Nature, PNAS, American Naturalist, and Physical Review Letters. He has published on a range of scientific and real-world problems, including cell biology and the 2008 financial crisis, and is the holder of four patents.

=== Books ===
- Bar-Yam, Y. (1997). Dynamics of Complex Systems. New York: Perseus Books. ISBN 978-0-2015-5748-0.
- Bar-Yam, Y. (2005). Making Things Work: Solving Complex Problems in a Complex World. Cambridge, MA: Knowledge Press. ISBN 978-0-9656-3282-9.

=== Selected papers ===
- Bar-Yam, Y.; Egami, T.; Mustre-Ed Leon, J.; Bishop, A. R., eds. (1992). Lattice Effects in High-Tc Superconductors: Proceedings of the Conference, Santa Fe, New Mexico, January 13-15, 1992. Cambridge, MA: World Scientific. ISBN 978-9-8102-0970-4.
- Bar-Yam, Y., ed. (2000). Unifying Themes in Complex Systems, Volume 1: Proceedings of the First International Conference on Complex Systems. New York: Perseus Books. ISBN 978-0-7382-0049-1.
- Bar-Yam, Y.; Minai, A. A., eds. (2003). Unifying Themes in Complex Systems, Volume 2: Proceedings of the Second International Conference on Complex Systems. New York: Perseus Books. ISBN 978-0-8133-4124-8.
- Lagi, M.; Bar-Yam, Yavni; Bertrand, K. Z.; Yaneer, Bar-Yam, eds. (2012). Economics of Food Prices and Crises. Cambridge, Massachusetts: New England Complex Systems Institute. ISBN 978-0-9656328-5-0.
- vos Fellman, P.; Bar-Yam, Y.; Minai, A. A., eds. (2015). Conflict and Complexity: Countering Terrorism, Insurgency, Ethnic and Regional Violence. New York: Springer. ISBN 978-1-4939-1704-4.

=== Theses ===
- Bar-Yam, Y. (1978). The MIT three-element radio interferometer (miniferometer) and observations of Saturn at 1.35 cm (BS thesis). Cambridge, MA: Massachusetts Institute of Technology.
- Bar-Yam, Y. (1984). Microscopic Theory of the Dynamics of Defects in Semiconductors (PhD thesis). Cambridge, MA: Massachusetts Institute of Technology.

=== Patents ===
- US 5687286, Bar-Yam, Yaneer, "Neural networks with subdivision", published 1997-11-11
- US 8296242, Bar-Yam, Yaneer, "Method and apparatus for coordinating and tracking delivery of a benefit", published 2012-10-23
- US 8683389, Bar-Yam, Yaneer; Harmon, Dion; Virdee, Kawandeep; Misra, Vedant; Lagi, Marco, "Method and apparatus for dynamic information visualization", published 2014-03-25
- US 10191956, Bar-Yam, Yaneer, "Event detection and characterization in big data streams", published 2019-01-29

== Honors ==
- 2011: Cited among the top scientific discoveries of 2011 by Wired magazine for his work on the causes of the global food crisis.
- 2011 and 2013: Received recognition among "best of" from Wired for his scientific visualizations.
- 2013: Received recognition among "best of" from Motherboard for his scientific visualizations.

== See also ==
- New England Complex Systems Institute (NECSI)
- Systems science
- Complex system
