= Microsoft Vine =

- Developer: Microsoft
- Release: April 2009
- Preview release: v1.0.2152.0
- Operating system: Windows XP, Windows Vista, Windows 7 Windows 8
- Type: Instant messaging
- License: Proprietary
- Website: www.vine.net (defunct)

Microsoft Vine was a service used to keep in touch with people in case of an emergency.

Vine was designed to keep family and friends in touch when other communication methods are either broken or not particularly efficient. Times of crisis usually involve a breakdown in mobile phone or other key communication infrastructures, and Vine was designed to be as hardy as possible to keep people connected.

== History ==
The idea for Microsoft Vine came to Microsoft GM Public Safety Initiatives Tammy Savage during Hurricane Katrina in 2005.

Development on Vine started in the latter part of 2006. A private beta was made available in April 2009.

Microsoft made the decision to discontinue Microsoft Vine effective 11 October 2010; a notice was placed on the main Vine page on 10 September 2010. informing users of the decision, stating "The decision to discontinue future development of Microsoft Vine was not easily made. Multiple options were thoroughly explored and evaluated with rigor and in the end it was determined that Microsoft Vine is not sustainable as a standalone offering."

== Legacy ==
According to the email sent by Microsoft to Vine users regarding the discontinuation of Vine, "The key learnings acquired over the past year from the Vine beta will be used to inform and strengthen future product concepts and offerings".

As a consequence, on January 16, 2013, Microsoft announced a new mobile app for Windows Phone, Android, and iOS called "HelpBridge" which "enables people to get and give help and find out about loved ones quickly after a natural disaster"

== Usage ==
According to the Microsoft Vine web site:

"The Microsoft Vine Beta connects you to the people and places you care about most, when it matters. Stay in touch with family and friends, be informed when someone needs help. Get involved to create great communities. Use alerts, reports and your personal dashboard to stay in touch, informed and involved."

Vine could be accessed via a desktop client (Windows only), text message or email.

Other planned devices included:

- any computer at all
- web browsers
- voice and landline telephones
- satellite phones
- OnStar

According to the Microsoft Vine Facebook page, Vine could be used to:

- Get help with childcare
- Connect with trusted neighbors
- Report a last-minute field change

It could also be used to contact family members in case of events such as a fire or medical emergency.
