= New England Complex Systems Institute =

American research institute

- Company type: Non-Profit
- Industry: Research
- Founded: 1996
- Headquarters: Cambridge, Massachusetts, USA
- Key people: Yaneer Bar-Yam, Founding President
- Products: Study of complex systems
- Website: necsi.edu

The New England Complex Systems Institute (NECSI) is an independent American research institution and think tank dedicated to advancing analytics and its application to the challenges of society, and the interaction of complex systems with the environment. NECSI offers educational programs, conducts research, and hosts the International Conference on Complex Systems. It was founded in 1996 and is located in Cambridge, Massachusetts.

== Overview ==
NECSI was established in 1996 by faculty of various New England academic institutions, including MIT, Harvard, Brandeis, and others, to encourage communication and collaboration among researchers studying complex systems.

The NECSI web site describes "complex systems" as follows:

Complex systems have multiple interacting components whose collective behavior cannot be simply inferred from the behavior of components. The recognition that understanding the parts cannot explain collective behavior has led to various new concepts and methodologies that are affecting all fields of science and engineering, and are being applied to technology, business and even social policy.

NECSI promotes collaboration and dissemination of new research among complex systems researchers in wide-ranging disciplines and numerous institutions. NECSI's activities for this purpose include hosting an international research conference and maintaining a roster of affiliated scholars and co-faculty.

== International Conference on Complex Systems ==
NECSI hosts the International Conference on Complex Systems (ICCS), whose aims are:

first, to investigate those properties or characteristics that appear to be common to the very different complex systems now under study; and second, to encourage cross fertilization among the many disciplines involved.

ICCS takes place on an occasional basis, with the most recent (eighth conference) in 2011. ICCS conferences have featured notable computer scientists (e.g., Gerald Sussman), mathematicians (e.g., Stephen Wolfram), systems theorists (e.g., John Sterman), physicists (e.g. Sandy Pentland), economists (e.g., James Stock), and others. Events at ICCS include research presentations and workshops, as well as pedagogical sessions aimed at a wider community.

== Affiliates and co-faculty ==
NECSI provides a public platform for affiliates and co-faculty at numerous academic institutions, primarily in the New England region. These researchers also contribute to NECSI educational programs.

Faculty and co-Faculty

- Yaneer Bar-Yam, President
- Michel Baranger
- Dan Braha
- Charles Cantor
- Richard Cooper
- Terrence Deacon
- Irving Epstein
- William Gelbart
- Ernest Hartmann
- Jerome Kagan
- Mehran Kardar
- Les Kaufman
- Eric Klopfer
- Frannie Leautier
- Blake LeBaron
- Luci Leykum
- Seth Lloyd
- Sandy Pentland
- Tom Petzinger
- Stuart Pimm
- Larry Rudolph
- Thomas Schelling
- Peter Senge
- Temple Smith
- John Sterman
- James Stock
- Nassim Nicholas Taleb
- Hiroshi Tasaka
- Günter Wagner
- Peter Timmer

Affiliates

- Marcus de Aguiar
- Zvi Bar-Yam
- Bruce M. Boghosian
- Raffaele Calabretta
- Jeffrey Cares
- Gavin Crooks
- Eric Feigl-Ding
- Meghan Dierks
- Melissa Gerber
- Helen Harte
- Steven Hassan
- Sui Huang
- Michael J. Jacobson
- Fumiaki Katagiri
- Andreas Kemper
- Mark Klein
- Greg Lindsay
- David Meyer
- Ali Minai
- Joseph Norman
- Hiroki Sayama
- Paul Seguin
- Tommaso Toffoli
- Omer Trajman
- Sheldon White
- Uri Wilensky

== Research areas ==
=== Evolution and ecology ===
NECSI researchers have contributed to the understanding of evolutionary dynamics, the evolution of altruism, the origin and characterization of biodiversity, and the interplay between evolution and ecology.

Much of the work done at NECSI has focused on the role of the spatial distribution of species, an often overlooked factor of evolutionary dynamics. In the case where portions of a population are geographically isolated from each other, for example, Yaneer Bar-Yam was able to demonstrate shortcomings in the gene-centered view of evolution, an approximation that is valid only if there is complete mixing of alleles in the gene pool.

=== Networks ===
Studies of network topologies have found surprising similarities between a variety of complex social, technological and biological networks. NECSI research in networks focuses on the relationship between structure, dynamics and function. The study of networks has emerged in diverse disciplines as a means of analyzing complex relational data.

=== Social systems ===
NECSI research in social systems focuses on the collective actions that create revolutions, ethnic violence, urban health, fads and panics, global food and so on. The role of individuals and organization can be analyzed by techniques and tools of complex systems.

=== Representation ===
Complex systems exhibit behaviors at a variety of spatial and temporal scales. Researchers working at NECSI have developed a mathematical formalism for simultaneously describing systems on multiple scales. This formalism had been applied to physical systems, information systems, organizational behavior, engineering projects and military conflict.

An essential tool for multiscale analysis, the complexity profile, the relationship between the observed complexity of a system and the scale of observation.

=== Post-crisis focus on social and economic systems ===
Since 2009, the Institute's research focus has shifted to socio-economic systems, with particular attention to the causes and consequences of the 2008 financial crisis and dynamics of Twitter networks and social sentiment. Policy-relevant articles on stock market regulation and market crashes, food riots and the causes of high food prices, and the European bond crisis have been released straight to the press. Peer-reviewed articles continue to appear on other subjects.

=== Further fields of research ===
- Systems biology
- Systems engineering
- Organizational management
- Negotiation
- Network Science

== Herbert A. Simon Award ==
The Herbert A. Simon Award is given by the Institute to "researchers who have made important lifetime contributions to the field of complex systems science." The winners are:

- Melanie Mitchell
- H. Eugene Stanley
- Thomas Schelling
- Muhammad Yunus
- John F. Nash Jr.
- Philip W. Anderson
- Stuart Kauffman

== Public attention ==
NECSI's work on the global food crisis has been widely cited by the press, by movements to curb financial speculation, and included among the top-10 discoveries in science in 2011 by Wired. NECSI's scientific visualizations have received multiple citations on top-10 lists.

NECSI has been called "a pioneer in using mathematics, computation and other quantitative methods to analyse topics like ethnic violence, economic crises and healthcare systems" by the press.

=== Early Warning on the COVID-19 Coronavirus Pandemic ===
Prior to global lockdowns, in January, 2020 Joseph Norman, Yaneer Bar Yam, and Nassim Taleb submitted a paper to the White House administration, urging them to take drastic steps to curtail the disease. NECSI later assembled EndCoronaVirus.org, which included over 4,000 volunteers by March 21, 2020. The network of volunteers built endCoronavirus.org with the goal to minimize the impact of COVID-19 by providing useful data and guidelines for action.

== See also ==
- Complex systems
- Santa Fe Institute
