= Lab website =

A lab(s) website is a specific type of website most commonly dedicated to research and development programs.

Relating to the classic scientific research environment - the laboratory - existing lab websites predominantly fall into two categories, the real-world and the virtual.

== Real-world laboratory websites ==
Real-world lab sites relate to the activities and research conducted by laboratories existing outside the Internet. In general, these sites tend to offer users a chance to see results of past research, rather than detailed views of contemporary research.

Examples of these types of labs from the aviation world include Boeing’s Phantom Works, which covers the research arm of the Boeing Corporation, and Lockheed Martin's Advanced Development Program, a.k.a. Skunk Works.

== Virtual laboratory websites ==
A number of companies and institutions have created virtual lab websites specifically for research into Internet-based products.

This research environment is seen as both podium and a playpen for Internet-borne companies. In many cases, the labs offer visitors a chance to learn more about the company's products currently in development and to try the work in progress.

One of the best-known examples is Google Labs. Since its inception, Google Labs has resulted in the trial and launch of live products such as Gmail, Google Calendar, and Google Videos.

Similar examples from large web-based companies include Yahoo! Next and Microsoft Live Labs.

One recent notable addition is Digg Labs, illustrating the Digg social bookmarking community's activities in near real-time. The labs are composed of the swarm and the stack activity displays.

Mozilla has added a lab area to its product offering.

Virtual laboratories are not the sole domain of companies and institutions. Some are created by individuals and exist solely as websites.

== Media labs ==
Traditional print and broadcast media companies have also begun to experiment with dedicating specific areas on their websites to advanced projects. One of the first companies credited with creating its own lab area was Reuters. When founded, the Reuters lab offered a limited number of products for visitors to experiment with, including the news and quotes widget and their mobile service.

The BBC has created a derivation on the lab idea with their BBC Backstage site. Backstage's slogan "Use our stuff to build your stuff" openly invites developers to use the BBC's various feeds and API's to power a new range of non-commercial products and services. The backstage site has allowed the BBC to create a developer network, a location for all those working with the BBC's content to come together and share their ideas and prototypes amongst their peers. The site also contains a blog.

The Guardian newspaper in the UK has taken the idea of a lab to the next level with its Comment is free product. Created by Ben Hammersley, Comment is Free was made as a fully interactive extension to the Guardian Unlimited’s blogging system.

The site contains the political and opinion material from both The Guardian and its sister paper The Observer, as well as work from over 600 separate subject-based experts, selected to write on their topics of knowledge. Users are encouraged to read and comment, and all posts are automatically linked to Technorati to return contextual blogosphere results.

In November 2006, NEWS.com.au, the breaking news section of News Digital Media launched News Lab, the first media-driven R&D website within News Corporation (N.B. News Corp also operates FIM Lab but this is currently without a website). The site aims to collect users' feedback on new products and amend them accordingly.

== Monitoring experimentation ==
While some media companies choose to create their own experimental areas, others create dedicated areas to document the efforts of others. The Washington Post's blog section, referred to as the Mashington Post records the efforts of Internet users' experimentation with combinations of pre-existing data, referred to as mashups.
