= Laboratory scissor jack =

Laboratory equipment

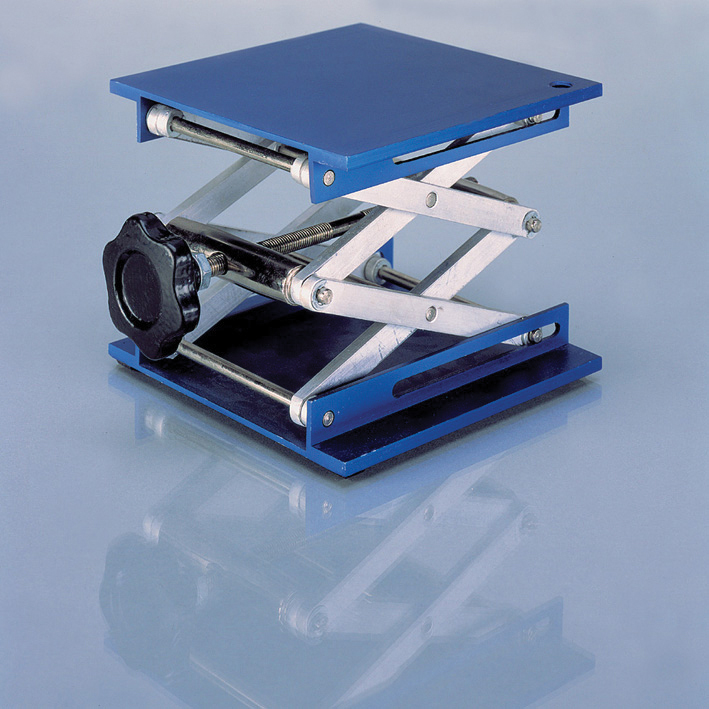
Manual laboratory scissor jack, or laboratory lifting platform for other laboratory equipments

Laboratory scissor jacks are lifting stages for beakers, flasks, water baths, stirrer, or other lab tools used to elevate equipment height to the user's needs, usually around 5 to 20 cm. It consists of metal pieces connected together in a scissor-like shape between a top and a bottom platform. The metal pieces acting as an adjustable lift using the scissors mechanism (or pantograph) in changing its height and also can withstand a wide range of weight.

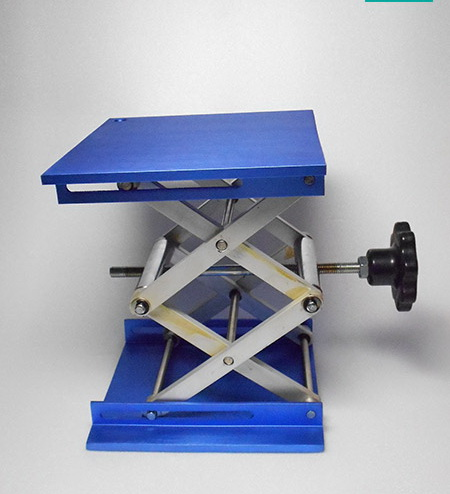
Manual laboratory scissor jack (side view)

== Manual lab jack ==
The manual laboratory scissor jack works mechanically by having a central screw connected to the central piece of metal between two layers of crossing metal pieces. The screw performs the same task as screws in hydraulic car lift, supporting the metal pieces in withstanding the oppressing weight. Turning the screw increases and decreases the angle between the metal pieces, resulting in extension and contraction of the platform height.

== See also ==
- Clamp (tool)
- Retort stand
