= OpenLayers =

JavaScript library for web mapping applications

- OpenLayers can communicate through several protocols
- Original author: MetaCarta
- Developer: The OpenLayers Dev Team
- Initial release: June 26, 2006
- Stable release: 10.6.0 / 16 June 2025; 3 months ago
- Repository: github.com/openlayers/openlayers
- Written in: JavaScript
- Platform: Web browser
- Type: Web mapping
- License: FreeBSD
- Website: openlayers.org

OpenLayers is a JavaScript library for displaying map data in web browsers as slippy maps. It provides an API for building rich web-based geographic applications similar to Google Maps and Bing Maps.

It is open-source, provided under the 2-clause BSD License.

== Features ==
OpenLayers supports GeoRSS, KML (Keyhole Markup Language), Geography Markup Language (GML), GeoJSON and map data from any source using OGC-standards as Web Map Service (WMS) or Web Feature Service (WFS).

== History ==
The library was originally based on the Prototype JavaScript Framework.

OpenLayers was created by MetaCarta after the O'Reilly Where 2.0 conference of June 29–30, 2005, and released as open source software before the Where 2.0 conference of June 13–14, 2006, by MetaCarta Labs. Two other open-source mapping tools released by MetaCarta are FeatureServer and TileCache. Since November 2007, OpenLayers has been an Open Source Geospatial Foundation project.
