= John Sterman =

American academic

John David Sterman
- Education: MIT Ph.D, 1982; Dartmouth College
- Known for: Business Dynamics: Systems thinking and modeling for a complex world
- Awards: Jay W. Forrester Prize
- Scientific career
- Fields: Systems science
- Workplaces: MIT, New England Complex Systems Institute

John David Sterman is the Jay W. Forrester Professor of Management, and the current director of the MIT System Dynamics Group at the MIT Sloan School of Management. He is also co-faculty at the New England Complex Systems Institute. He is mostly considered as the current leader of the System Dynamics school of thought. He is the author of Business Dynamics: Systems Thinking and Modeling for a Complex World.

Prof. Sterman has twice been awarded the Jay W. Forrester Prize for the best published work in system dynamics, won an IBM Faculty Award, won the Accenture Award for the best paper of the year published in the California Management Review, has seven times won awards for teaching excellence, and was named one of the MIT Sloan School's "Outstanding Faculty" by the Business Week Guide to the Best Business Schools. He has been featured on public television's News Hour, National Public Radio's Marketplace, CBC television, Fortune, the Financial Times, Business Week, and other media for his research and innovative use of interactive simulations in management education and policymaking.

He was an undergraduate at Dartmouth College and received his Ph.D. from the MIT Sloan School of Management in 1982.

His research focuses on improving managerial decision making in complex systems. He has pioneered so-called "management flight simulators" used for learning to manage the complexity of corporate and economic systems.

== Publications ==
John Sterman has written a few books and several articles. A selection:

- 1994. Modeling for learning organizations. Edited with John D. W. Morecroft
- 2000. Business Dynamics: Systems thinking and modeling for a complex world. McGraw Hill.

Articles:

- 2005. "Operational and Behavioral Causes of Supply Chain Instability"
