= Birch Communications =

American telecommunications company

- Industry: Telecommunications and Information Technology
- Founded: 1996
- Defunct: 2018
- Area served: United States, Canada, Puerto Rico
- Products: VOIP Services, Voice Services, Network Services, Cloud Computing Services, Mobile Services
- Number of employees: 1,400 (2014)
- Parent: Fusion Connect
- Website: fusionconnect.com

Birch Communications was an American provider of IP-based communications, network broadband, cloud computing, and information technology services to small, mid-sized, enterprise and wholesale business customers in the United States, Canada and Puerto Rico. It was acquired by Fusion Connect in 2018 and integrated into the company. Founded in 1996 in the wake of the 1996 Telecommunications Act, several years later the company began acquiring other telecom companies in an effort to increase its network size and service offerings. Birch Communications raised $77.5 million in funding in 2011, and $110 million in funding in 2012 after it financed a new $90 million facility.

Atlanta Business Chronicle named Birch one of Atlanta's Top 50 Private Companies in 2013, and that year company revenues were approximately $207 million. Birch Communications also acquired Cbeyond in 2014 for $323 million, which expanded Birch’s cloud service offerings. In September 2014, Birch announced that they had made 24 acquisitions, worth more than $500 million. Birch has regional operations centers in Atlanta, Macon, Georgia and Emporia, Kansas with approximately 1,400 employees. Tony Tomae serves as Birch’s president and chief executive officer.

== History ==
=== Founding as Access Integrated Networks (1996–1999) ===
Birch was founded in 1996 as Access Integrated Networks by Thomas Wright and partners. Initially the headquarters of the IT service provider were located in Macon, Georgia, near Atlanta, Georgia. Access was formed directly in the wake of the Telecom Act of 1996, and initially the company was a "re-seller of telecom services focused on the under-served small- and medium-sized business customer segments." Using a business model developed by its founders such as Thomas Wright, the company used a different funding model than many other competitive local exchange carriers in that they weren't reliant on venture capitalists. By 1997, the company had a client base of around 100.

=== Early acquisitions (2000–2007) ===
"Like many competitive telecom leader hopefuls, Oddo and his partners took advantage of the FCC's landmark 1996 Telecommunications Act and founded Access Integrated Networks, but the one striking difference was that unlike other CLECs they weren't dependent on venture capitalists that were anxious to get a quick exit strategy."
— Fierce Telecom in November 2011

In 2001, the company's founders began funding acquisitions with their own bank accounts and company profits. By 2002, Access Integrated Networks was serving nine states and had annual revenue of $40 million. Oddo became president and CEO in 2003, also retaining a role as one of three shareholders. Oddo previously had served as chief information officer and president of Graphic Scanning, which had been acquired by Bell South in 1992, and had also served executive roles at NuVox Communications and Network Telephone. In 2003, Oddo "implemented a major shift in business strategy," and focused on building out the size of the company's IP network through acquisitions.

In November 2005, Access Integrated Networks acquired customers from Kentucky-based Cinergy Communications. Access then acquired 43,000 local access lines from Trinsic Communications in November 2006, a Delaware-based provider of local and long distance telephone services. At the same time, Access also assumed Sprint Local assets. In 2006, Access had annual revenues of around $70 million. Access purchased local, long-distance residential and SMB customers in Florida and Georgia from IDT Telecom in April 2007. By later that year, Access was serving nine states in the southeast and had 215 employees. Its business involved 75 percent reselling the services of companies such as AT&T, with around 25 percent of its business conducted on its own network. Based in Atlanta, Access as of 2007 also maintained its operational headquarters in nearby Macon.

=== Merger and expansion (2007–2010) ===
Access Integrated Networks started the acquisition of Birch Telecom in November 2007. Birch was a large telecom company in Kansas City which had recently survived two bankruptcies. Though undergoing financial difficulties, Birch provided voice and internet services to customers in 26 states. The final transaction took place for an undisclosed sum in February 2008, with the new combined annual revenue of the companies reaching $200 million. Together, combined employees equaled 400, and combined voice and data lines equaled 300,000. Vincent Oddo retained his role as president and CEO of Access, with no layoffs announced as part of the merger. Access Integrated Networks rechristened the integrated company as Birch Communications on July 1, 2008, with headquarters remaining in Atlanta. Birch Telecom's operations in Kansas City, Emporia, Kansas, Macon, and Atlanta remained intact.

In late 2008, Birch Communications Inc. purchased approximately 30,000 business access lines from North Little Rock, Arkansas-based Navigator Telecommunications for an undisclosed sum. The acquisition increased consumer density for Birch in existing markets and allowed it to expand into California and Arkansas. With the acquisition, Birch increased its market presence to 31 states, with around 325,000 access lines. The acquisition of Cleartel Communications in August 2009 added around 100,000 business and residential sites to Birch’s customer base as well as facilities in Florida. Birch finalized a purchase of Freedom Communications USA's assets in October 2010. In December 2010, Birch then finished the acquisition of assets from American Fiber Network and CloseCall America. The acquisitions added 60,000 access lines to Birch’s customer base of 300,000 and expanded Birch’s operations to 38 states.

=== Growth intro Florida, new funding (2011–2012) ===
In April 2011, Birch acquired Acutel assets, a company which is based in Dallas, Texas. Birch Communications finished a $77.5 million funding round in June 2011. The company announced that some of the funds would be used to finance further acquisitions, with a Birch spokesman explaining that "we've gotten very good at integrating new customer bases into our systems and not increasing our [operational] costs. We run a tight ship." In October 2011, 56,000 business and residential access lines in the Orlando, Florida area were added to Birch's network, with the acquisition of Cordia Communications for $8 million. The acquisition was financed in part from the funding round that summer. By November 2011, all excluding two of the 12 acquisitions made by Birch since 2001 (Acutel and Cordia) had been "funded through its own profits and from the bank accounts of Oddo and his partners."

By January 2012, Birch maintained IP-based communications in 38 states. While the company had originally focused on being a "local telephone provider and long distance reseller," by that time the company had also branched into "communications and IT services" delivered through its private IP network. Since 1997, Birch's client base grown from around 100 customers to 100,000 customers, largely through acquisitions. Birch continued its expansion into Florida when it acquired the operating assets of AstroTel in April 2012. The assets included an IP network spanning the Tampa Bay, Florida area and was Birch’s fourteenth acquisition since 2006. Birch acquired the assets of dpiTeleconnect in May 2012. In June 2012, CIT Vendor Finance awarded Birch a $7.5 million equipment financing deal. Birch Communications then announced an infusion of $110 million in cash in July 2012, after it financed a new $90 million facility with various investors. Birch purchased Port Charlotte, Florida-based DayStar Communications in October 2012. The deal expanded Birch’s small and medium business customer base in southwest Florida and other parts of the southeastern United States.

=== Covista acquisition (2013) ===
Birch Carrier Solutions, the wholesale division of Birch Communications, Inc., expanded throughout 2013. That year, wholesale clients such as Belgacom and Primus Telecommunications were added to their client portfolio. In February 2013, CoBank committed around $12 million to Birch's operations, becoming a part of Birch's Senior Secured Credit Facility Syndication Group. Birch continued its “tuck in” acquisition strategy with its March 2013 acquisition of Chattanooga, Tennessee-based Covista Communications. The strategy targeted companies that would increase customer density and expand Birch’s network near existing markets. Covista Communications was a facilities-based telecommunications service provider with business and residential customers in 48 states, and large switching centers in Tennessee and New York. The acquisition expanded Birch's network by ten states, bringing its total number covered to 45.

In May 2013, Birch acquired Louisville, Kentucky-based Lightyear Network Solutions for $22 million. The acquisition allowed Birch to expand its Birch IP-Network service to 11 states. In August 2013, Birch acquired Norcross, Georgia-based Ernest Communications. Ernest had been a major wholesale customer of Birch, and the acquisition expanded Birch’s operations to all 50 American states, Puerto Rico, and Canada. Birch announced it was offering prepaid wireless services via its Tempo Communications unit in November 2013. Previously Birch had only offered prepaid home phones. By that time, the company had 500,000 access lines nationwide. Company revenues in 2013 totaled approximately $207 million. Atlanta Business Chronicle named Birch one of Atlanta's Top 50 Private Companies in October 2013, as ranked by company-wide revenue.

=== Cbeyond acquisition (2014) ===
Birch acquired customers from Liberty-Bell Telecom in June 2014, a subsidiary of DishNet. The acquisition expanded Birch’s customer base in the Denver, Colorado area. Later that month, Birch acquired Louisiana-based EveryCall. Birch Communications also acquired Atlanta-based Cbeyond in July 2014 for $323 million. Following the purchase, Cbeyond was delisted from the NASDAQ stock exchange and its operations were folded into Birch. The acquisition marked a change in Birch’s service portfolio and expanded Birch’s cloud service offerings. The same month Birch acquired Nebraska-based Selectel Communications, its 20th acquisition since 2006.

In September 2014, Birch announced that they undergone 24 acquisitions overall, worth more than $500 million. In November 2014 Birch challenged in federal court a DMCA subpoena issued by Rightscorp. Birch refused to hand over personal information on its customers and called the subpoena an “invasive and overly broad” fishing expedition. Birch also alleged that Rightscorp was trying to exploit a lack of knowledge among smaller regional ISPs that DMCA subpoenas are not applicable to peer-to-peer file sharing. In December 2014, Birch opened a new sales office in Detroit. Birch had 1,400 overall employees at the time.

=== Recent developments (2015–2017) ===
In January 2015, Birch announced an expansion of its office in Emporia, Kansas. In February that same year, Birch launched a fiber-based network expansion in Houston, Los Angeles and Washington, D.C. Also that month, BenchmarkPortal awarded Birch their Center of Excellence award for customer service for the third consecutive year. In April 2015, Birch began expanding Metro-Fiber in Dallas, Houston, Denver, and Los Angeles. As a result, at the time Birch served 686 buildings nationwide with its fiber network, also reaching around 20,000 businesses with ethernet and voice services.

In May 2015, a federal judge ruled Birch would not be required to release customer information despite a subpoena issued by Rightscorp in regard to copyright infringement issues. 5Linx sold its telecommunications branch to Birch Communications, also in May 2015, and the following month Birch acquired the customer assets of OrbitCom, Inc., a voice a data solutions provider. In August 2015, Birch Communications was named one of the 2015 Fastest-Growing Private Companies in America by Inc. Magazine, ranking No. 2,563 with a three-year growth rate of 143%. It was the sixth time that Birch ranked on the list, following 2004, 2009, 2010, 2011, and 2012.

Birch acquired Primus Telecommunications Canada, a large telecom reseller, in January 2016. Based in Toronto, Ontario, Canada, Primus added around 200,000 residential customers and 23,000 business clients in Canada, as well as residential customers in the United States and Puerto Rico.

=== Acquisition by Fusion ===
On May 7, 2018 Fusion Connect Inc. closed the acquisition of Birch Communications Holdings, Inc. The transaction carried a total enterprise value of approximately $600 million, consisting of approximately 50 million shares of Fusion common stock and the refinancing of $444 million of Birch indebtedness. The combined entity will own about 31,000 route miles of fiber optic cabling.

On June 15, 2019, Fusion filed for Chapter 11 bankruptcy. The company emerged from bankruptcy on January 14, 2020.

== Products and services ==
Focusing on both residential and business clients, Birch Communications offers services such as "local and long distance voice, broadband Internet access, T1, PRI, bonded T1, mobile voice and data, e-mail, voicemail," and prepaid phone services in each state, Canada, and Puerto Rico. Birch offers DSL and fiber internet connections, as well as BirchLink, a business-grade internet. Other Birch product brand names include BirchCloud, BirchVoice, BirchNetwork, BirchMobile, and BirchIT Services. BirchCloud offers TotalCloud PBX, a cloud based phone. The company also introduced a new BYOD program, allowing customers to use their own SIP-compliant handset devices with its TotalCloud PBX offering. Rather than through the public internet, Birch voice and data services are typically delivered using VoIP technology on the company's own IP-Network.

== Facilities and staff ==
As of 2016, the company has regional operations centers in the Georgia cities of Atlanta and Macon, as well as Emporia, Kansas. There are six main data centers throughout the United States, and Birch connects to 400,000 fiber-lit buildings with 31,000 fiber route miles. Birch had 1,400 employees in 2014, with around 450 people working out of the company's Atlanta Operations Center as of 2016.

== Community involvement ==
Birch has been involved in various philanthropic efforts and community projects, including donating toys and funds to the non-profit organization Kids Yule Love in 2011, co-sponsoring the International Cherry Blossom Festival in 2013, and donating funds to Atlanta's Woodruff Arts Center in 2014. Birch invested in Macon Charter Academy in August 2015, donating funds, computer equipment, and furniture to the Georgia charter school and serving as a technology consultant during construction. In February 2016, Birch donated PCs and laptops to the Metro Atlanta Task Force for the Homeless to be used for job-training at the Peachtree-Pine shelter.

== Acquisition timeline ==
The following is an incomplete timeline of major acquisitions by Birch Communications:

2005

- Cinergy (November)

2006

- Trinsic Communications (August)
- Sprint Local (November)

2007

- IDT Telecom (April)

2008

- Birch Telecom (February)
- Navigator (November)

2009

- Cleartel (August)

2010

- Freedom USA (September)
- American Fibernet and CloseCall America (December)

2011

- Accutel of Texas (April)
- Cordia Communications (October )

2012

- Astrotel (April)
- dpiTeleconnect (May)
- Daystar Communications (October)

2013

- Covista Communications (March)
- Ernest Communications (August)
- Lightyear Network Solutions (September)

2014

- Liberty-Bell Telecom (June)
- EveryCall (June)
- Selectel (July)
- Cbeyond (July)

2015

- Orbitcom (June)

2016

- Primus Telecommunications Canada (January)

== See also ==
- Economy of Atlanta
- Competitive local exchange carrier
- List of telephone operating companies
- List of United States telephone companies
