= Nearmap =

Australian technology company

Nearmap Pty Ltd
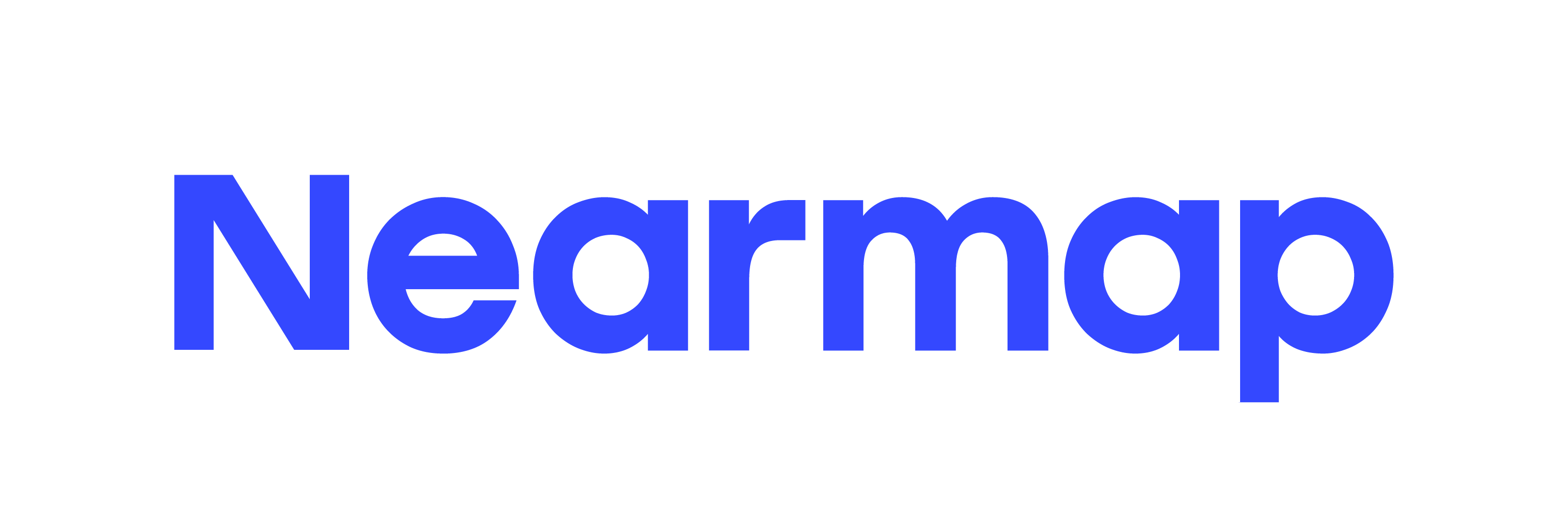

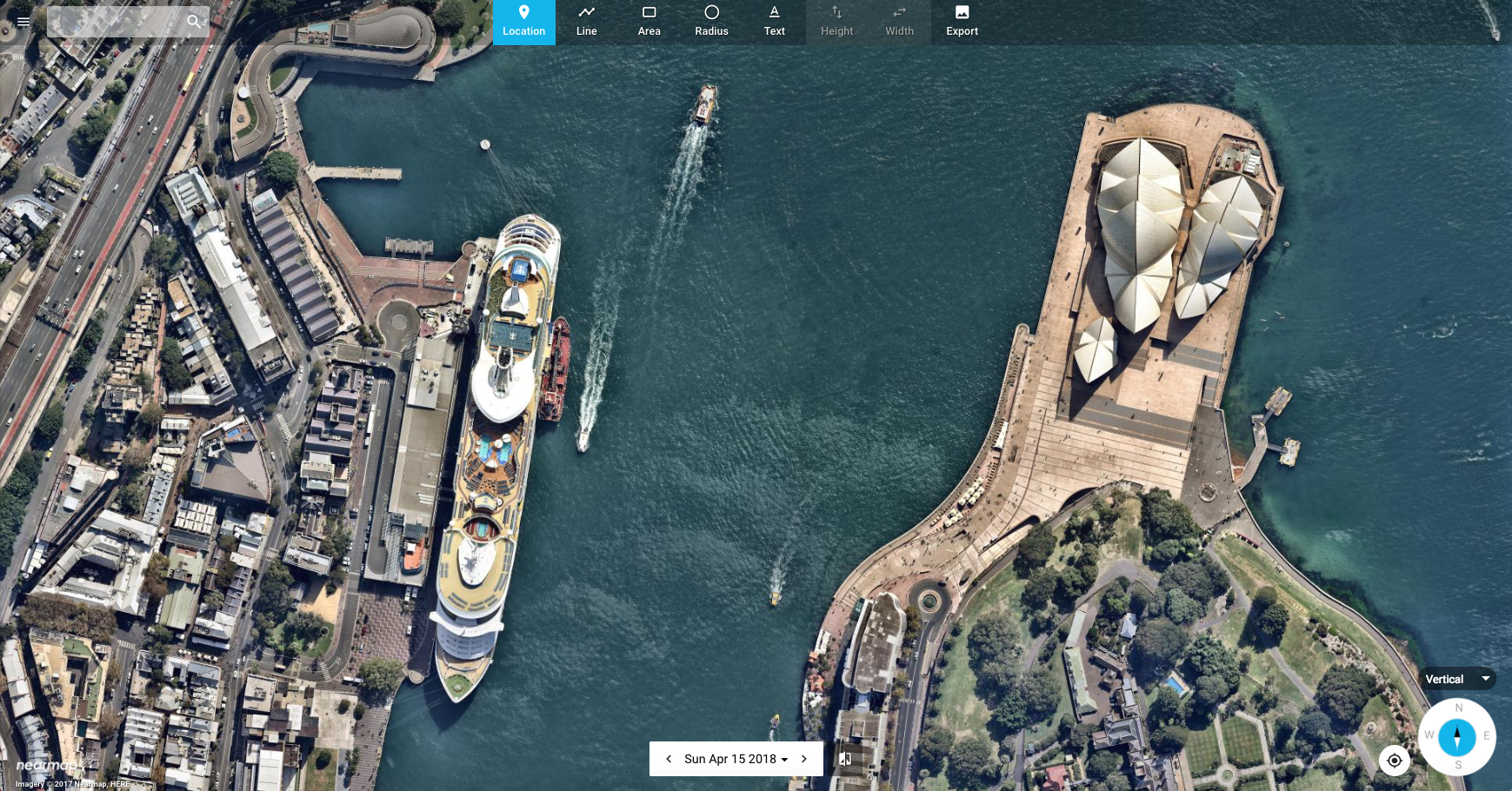
- Screenshot of Nearmap's web portal showing Sydney, Australia.
- Company type: Private
- Founded: 2008; 18 years ago in Perth, Australia
- Headquarters: Sydney, Australia
- Owner: Thoma Bravo
- Key people: Andy Watt (CEO)
- Industry: Aerial Technology
- Products: Nearmap Vertical; Nearmap Oblique; Nearmap 3D; Nearmap AI; Nearmap ImpactResponse
- Revenue: A$146.0 million (2022)
- Website: www.nearmap.com

Nearmap (officially Nearmap Pty Ltd) is an aerial technology company headquartered in Australia providing data and insights to various industries, including insurance companies, governments and other businesses. Insights come from proprietary artificial intelligence deriving data from frequently-updated, high-resolution aerial imagery. This location intelligence covers up to 95% of Australia's population, 87% of the United States population, 75% of the New Zealand population, and 66% of Canada's population. It was a publicly traded company on the Australian Securities Exchange until being taken private by Thoma Bravo in 2022.

== History ==
=== Origins and founding ===
Nearmap was founded in 2008 by Stuart Nixon in Perth, Western Australia. Nearmap's first capture of aerial imagery dates back to 2007.

In 2012, the business was acquired by an ASX-listed company Ipernica and became the primary entity. Nearmap then moved its headquarters from Perth to Sydney.

=== Expansion ===
In 2014, the company expanded into the United States market. In 2017, Nearmap expanded its capture program and surveyed New Zealand's top 13 most populated cities, including Queenstown. The same year, Nearmap expanded its aerial imaging content to provide 3D models of Australia's major capital cities.

=== Private ownership and acquisitions ===
In August 2022, private equity firm Thoma Bravo agreed to buy Nearmap for A$1.06 billion (US$730 million).

In 2025, Nearmap, backed by Thoma Bravo, bought itel, an insurance technology provider, from GTCR, a private-equity firm.

== Business ==
=== Concept ===
Historically, aerial imagery was available mainly to government and large enterprises, as it was quite an expensive and long process. First, a surveying company had to be engaged to take photos of a certain area of interest. Then, the data would be manually processed and stitched together digitally to create aerial maps. Imagery was then delivered on a hard disk. The entire process could take months and was repeated once every few years at best.

Nearmap disrupted this model by creating a patented camera system and software pipeline that enables the company to capture aerial photos, stitch them together into seamless digital maps, and publish the content online within days of capture. By capturing images with airplanes (as opposed to with satellites), Nearmap is impacted less by weather and atmospheric obstructions.

With the cost of capture significantly lower than anything else on the market, Nearmap can update surveys more frequently and at a much lower cost. Its subscription model has made high-quality aerial imagery more accessible for businesses and government organizations. Nearmap captures aerial images frequently, up to six times a year in urban centres, at a resolution of 5.8–7.5 cm per pixel or better.

Nearmap serves over 11,200 businesses and organisations globally.

=== Product ===
Nearmap provides many types of content including Vertical, Panorama, Measurable Obliques, 3D, Artificial Intelligence and Roof Geometry.

Vertical imagery is also known as orthorectified, providing a top-down view of the ground captured at a 90° angle. Orthorectification is a process used to correct the terrain distortion in aerial or satellite images that results from variations in the surface of the Earth and tilt of the satellite or aerial sensor being used to collect the data. This process allows accurate information to be gathered from the images such as distances, angles, and positions.

The Nearmap Panorama product provides a mosaic view of locations and features from all four cardinal directions in a single view. Nearmap Panorama allows users to pan and zoom across a large footprint uninterrupted, allowing information to be reviewed quickly.

Nearmap's Measurable Obliques allow users to make accurate height measurements of buildings and other ground features. Users can then export these images with the measurements and annotations included, allowing multiple stakeholders to communicate with accurate detail to an entire project team.

Nearmap aerial imagery is delivered through a cloud-based interface called MapBrowser or through API integrations. The MapBrowser web application allows users to navigate and search Nearmap's library of current and historical content, and includes tools for measuring and analyzing locations. Nearmap's APIs offer integration with ArcGIS, Autodesk, CAMA systems, and other leading GIS and CAD applications via standard industry protocols including WMS, WMTS, and TMS. Along with current imagery, Nearmap's online archive offers a gallery of historical imagery dating back to 2008 for some parts of Australia.

In May 2021, EagleView Technologies and Pictometry International accused Nearmap of infringing their patents covering roof estimation technology. Five years later, Nearmap and EagleView settled the court case in May 2026.
