= Pictometry =

Aerial survey technique

Pictometry is a patented aerial survey technique for producing oblique georeferenced imagery showing the fronts and sides of buildings and locations on the ground. Photos are captured by low-flying airplanes, depicting up to 12 perspectives (shot from a 40-degree angle) as well as an orthogonal (overhead) view of every location flown. These perspectives are then stitched together to create composite aerial maps that may span many miles of terrain. Because they are captured at an angle, the pixels in the resulting images are trapezoidal, rather than rectangular. This necessitates special software and algorithms to accurately determine objects’ size and position on the maps.

== Uses ==
Pictometry imagery can be overlaid with various shapefiles and GIS information because every pixel is georeferenced to its exact location on the earth. This allows pictometry imagery to be integrated into many existing GIS software applications for use in many businesses, while creating a much richer database of the real world. Measurements that can be made directly on pictometry imagery include area, distance, height, elevation, pitch, and bearing, among others. Pictometry imagery is used by federal, state and local governments for emergency response/9-1-1, GIS, planning and development, and assessment. Commercial industries including insurance, construction, utilities, and real estate utilize such imagery to streamline business activities.

== Legal protection ==
Pictometry was invented by the Pictometry International Corporation, now EagleView Technologies. It is protected under US law, including Patent Ser. No. 60,425,275, filed Nov. 8, 2002, and licensed to companies across the globe
