= Remote sensing =

Obtaining information through non-contact sensors

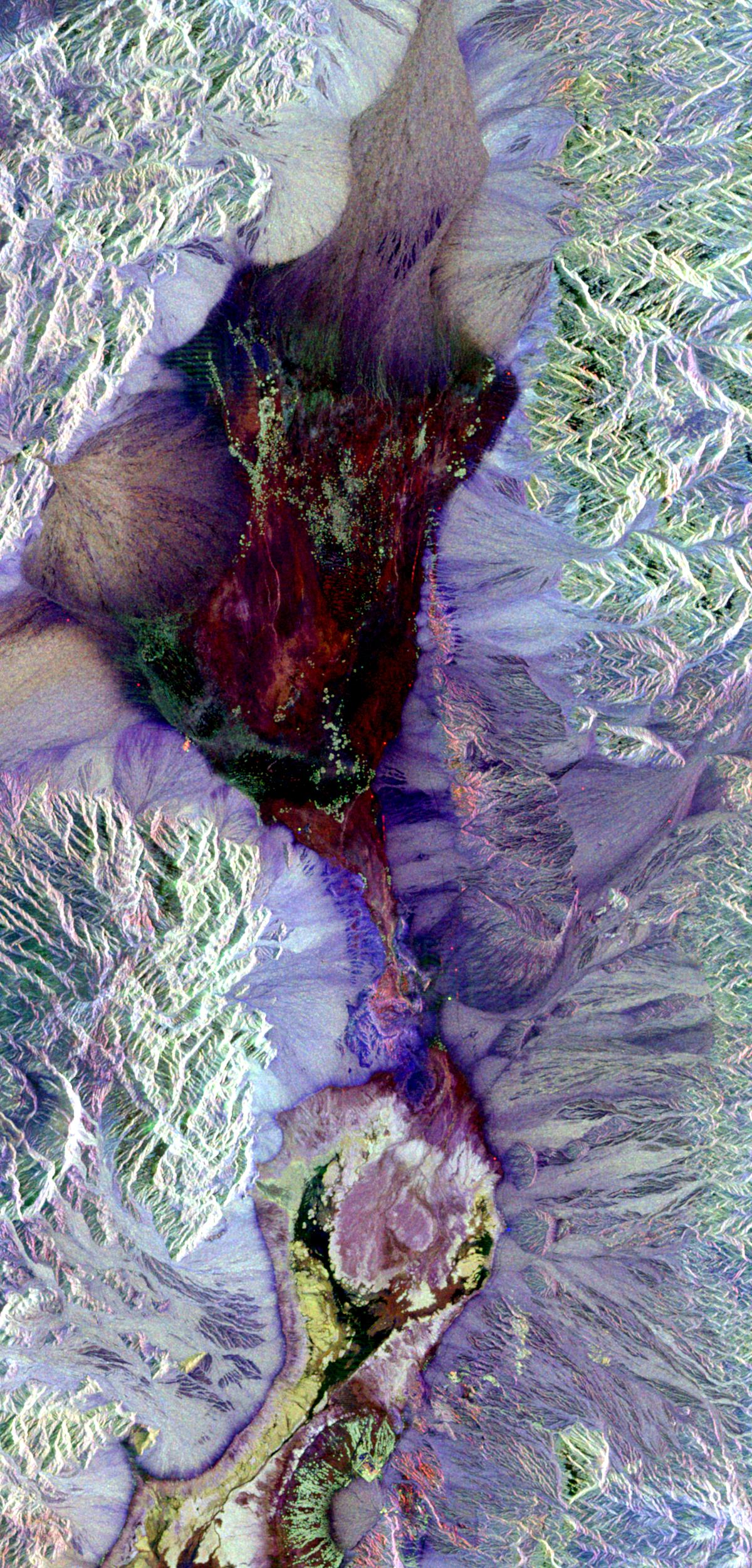
Synthetic aperture radar image of Death Valley colored using polarimetry

Remote sensing is the acquisition of information about an object or area from a distance, without touching it, as opposed to measuring it on-site observation. The term often refers to observing Earth from satellites or aircraft, but also covers studies of other planets and some ship- or ground-based methods, such as sonar. Remote sensing produces the satellite views in online maps and the cloud imagery shown in weather forecasts.

Remote sensing is used in numerous fields, including geophysics, geography, land surveying and most Earth science disciplines (e.g. exploration geophysics, hydrology, ecology, meteorology, oceanography, glaciology, geology). It also has military, intelligence, commercial, economic, planning, and humanitarian applications, among others.

In current usage, the term remote sensing generally refers to the use of satellite- or airborne-based sensor technologies to detect and classify objects on Earth. It includes the surface and the atmosphere and oceans, based on propagated signals (e.g. electromagnetic radiation). It may be split into "active" remote sensing (when a signal is emitted by a sensor mounted on a satellite or aircraft to the object and its reflection is detected by the sensor) and "passive" remote sensing (when the reflection of sunlight is detected by the sensor).

== Overview ==
Video on how the African Wildlife Foundation used Landsat to identify areas of conservation in the Democratic Republic of the Congo, and how it was used to help map an area called MLW in the north.

Remote sensing methods are generally classed as passive or active. Passive sensors record natural energy that an object or scene emits or reflects; sunlight reflected by the surface is the source they most often measure. Common passive instruments include photography, both film and digital, as well as radiometers and spectrometers. These often operate in the visible, infrared, thermal infrared and microwave bands. Active sensors supply their own energy: they direct radiation at a target, and then detect and measure what is reflected or scattered back from the target. Radar and lidar are active systems that time the interval between sending a pulse and receiving its return, which can give the distance to the target. Repeated or Doppler measurements can establish a target's speed and direction.

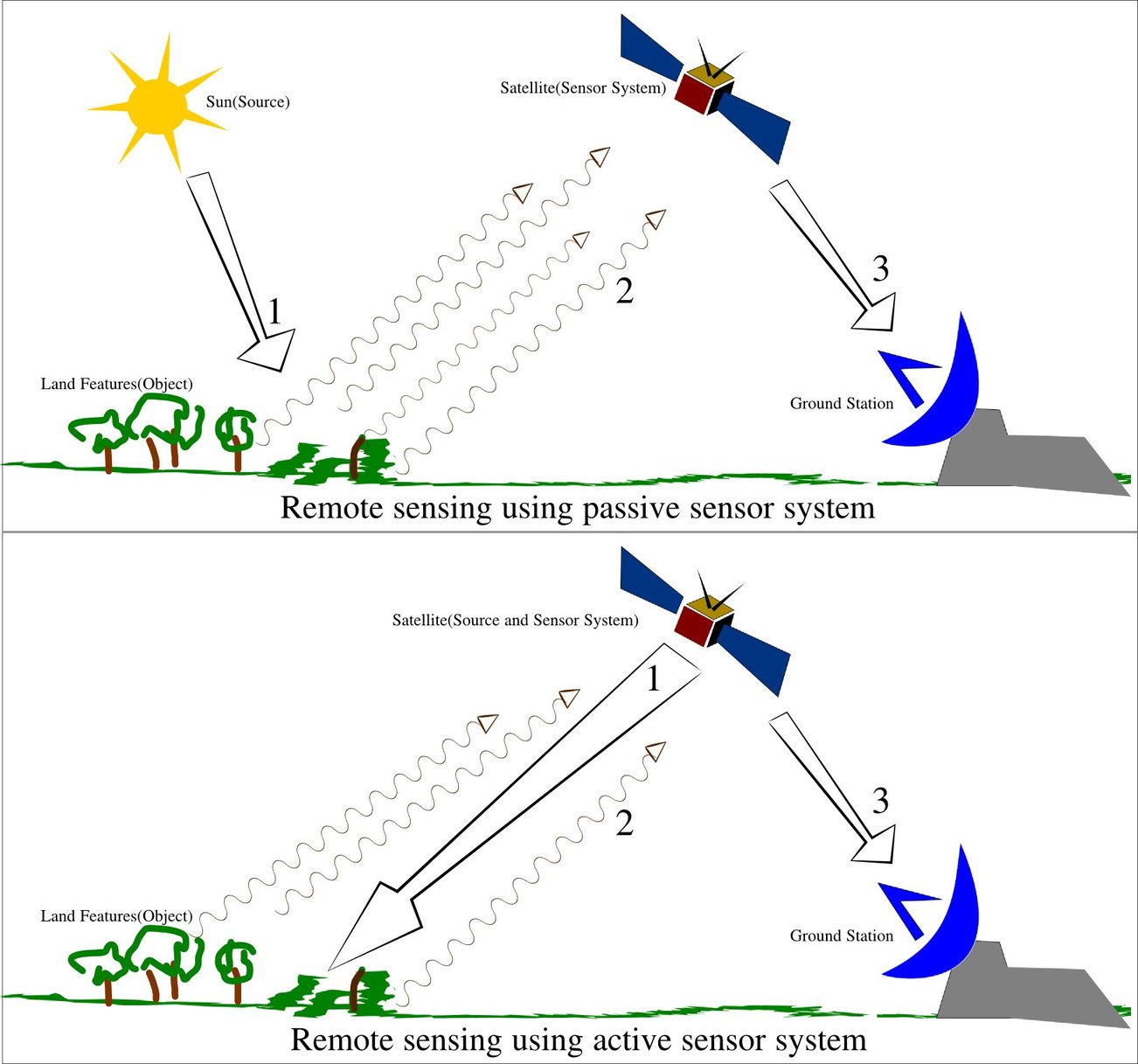
Illustration of remote sensing

Remote sensing allows data to be gathered from areas that are dangerous or difficult to reach. In polar regions for example, large distances and low temperatures hamper ground studies of glaciers, ice shelves and ice sheets, so researchers rely on airborne and satellite measurements. Brazil's National Institute for Space Research has measured deforestation in the Amazon Basin every year since 1988 using Landsat-class imagery. Shallow coastal waters can be surveyed with airborne bathymetric lidar, which is safer and more efficient then sending survey crews out by boat, and remote sensing has been used to map the topography of the ocean floor. During the Cold War, most American aerial reconnaissance was flown along the borders and casts of the Soviet Union at a distance, rather than over its territory. More generally, remote sensing can replace slower and most expensive fieldwork without disturbing the area or object being studied.

Orbital platforms (i.e. satellites) collect and transmit data across different parts of the electromagnetic spectrum. Combined with aircraft, ship and ground-based measurement, these data enable researchers to study natural phenomena over short and long timescales. El Niño for example is tracked by merging satellite altimetry with readings from moored buoys in the tropical Pacific. Other uses include natural resource management, mapping wildlife habitat for conservation, greenhouse gas monitoring, oil spill detection and monitoring, and national security.

== Data acquisition ==
The basis for multispectral collection and analysis is that of examined areas or objects that reflect or emit radiation that stand out from surrounding areas. For a summary of major remote sensing satellite systems see the overview table.

=== Applications of remote sensing ===
Radar image of Aswan Dam, Egypt taken by Umbra

==== Radar ====
Conventional radar is mostly associated with air traffic control, early warning, and certain large-scale meteorological data. Doppler radar is used by local law enforcements' monitoring of speed limits and in enhanced meteorological collection such as wind speed and direction within weather systems in addition to precipitation location and intensity. Other types of active collection includes plasmas in the ionosphere. Interferometric synthetic aperture radar is used to produce precise digital elevation models of large scale terrain (See RADARSAT, TerraSAR-X, Magellan). Laser and radar altimeters on satellites have provided a wide range of data. By measuring the bulges of water caused by gravity, they map features on the seafloor to a resolution of a mile or so. By measuring the height and wavelength of ocean waves, the altimeters measure wind speeds and direction, and surface ocean currents and directions. Ultrasound (acoustic) and radar tide gauges are used to measure sea level, tides and wave direction in coastal and offshore tide gauges.

==== Light detection and ranging (LiDAR) ====
Light detection and ranging (LiDAR) is used for weapon ranging, laser illuminated homing of projectiles, and to detect and measure the concentration of various chemicals in the atmosphere while airborne LiDAR can be used to measure the heights of objects and features on the ground more accurately than radar technology. LiDAR can be used to detect ground surface changes typically by creating Digital Surface Models (DSMs) or Digital Elevation Models (DEMs). Vegetation remote sensing is a principal application of LIDAR.

==== Radiometers and Photometers ====
The most common instruments in use are radiometers and photometers, which collect reflected and emitted radiation in a wide range of frequencies. The most prevalent of these frequencies are visible and infrared sensors, followed by microwave, gamma-ray, and rarely, ultraviolet. They may also be used to detect the emission spectra of various chemicals, providing data on chemical concentrations in the atmosphere. Radiometers are also used at night, as artificial light emissions are a key signature of human activity. Applications include remote sensing of population, GDP, and damage to infrastructure from war or disasters. Radiometers and radar onboard of satellites can be also used to monitor volcanic eruptions.

==== Spectropolarimetric Imaging ====
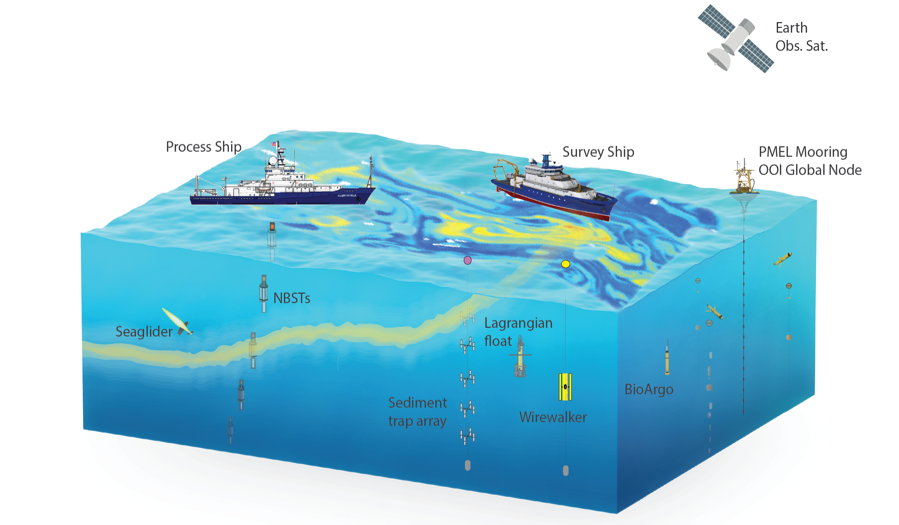
Examples of remote sensing equipment deployed by or interfaced with oceanographic research vessels

Spectropolarimetric Imaging has been reported to be useful for target tracking purposes by researchers at the U.S. Army Research Laboratory. They determined that manmade items possess polarimetric signatures that are not found in natural objects. These conclusions were drawn from the imaging of military trucks, like the Humvee, and trailers with their acousto-optic tunable filter dual hyperspectral and spectropolarimetric VNIR Spectropolarimetric Imager.

==== Aerial platforms and Satellites ====
Stereoscopic pairs of aerial photographs have often been used to make topographic maps by imagery and terrain analysts in trafficability and highway departments for potential routes, in addition to modelling terrestrial habitat features.

Simultaneous multi-spectral platforms such as Landsat have been in use since the early 1970s. These thematic mappers take images in multiple wavelengths and are usually found on Earth observation satellites, including (for example) the Landsat program or the IKONOS satellite. Maps of land cover and land use from thematic mapping can be used to prospect for minerals, detect or monitor land usage, detect invasive vegetation, deforestation, and examine the health of indigenous plants and crops (satellite crop monitoring), including entire farming regions or forests. Prominent scientists using remote sensing for this purpose include Janet Franklin and Ruth DeFries. Landsat images are used by regulatory agencies such as KYDOW to indicate water quality parameters including Secchi depth, chlorophyll density, and total phosphorus content. Weather satellites are used in meteorology and climatology.

==== False Color Composites (FCCs) and Pseudocolor ====
A major remote sensing application, used broadly across fields such as urban planning and environmental studies, is False Color Composites (FCCs) and Pseudocolor maps. An FCC is a color-rendering method in which a true-color image (a photograph or image that the human eye would render) is altered to appear in different colors. The purpose is typically to identify patterns the human eye cannot normally detect, or highlight certain land cover uses. Pseudocolor uses one spectral band and maps it to a new color spectrum rather than the original gray band. FCCs and Pseudocolor mapping remain vital tools for visualizing data spatially by allowing researchers to treat non-visible wavelengths as visible.

===== How it works =====
====== False Color Composite ======
Humans use three spectral bands to perceive color: red, green, and blue. Remote sensing platforms such as ArcGIS and QGIS similarly compose images using three color bands. Therefore, a true color image assigns red light wavelengths (620-750 nm) to the red band, and green and blue light wavelengths (495-570 nm and 450-485 nm) to the green and blue bands, respectively. FCCs are easily made by rearranging which wavelengths on the electromagnetic spectrum are assigned to certain color bands. For example, a Color Infrared composite assigns Near Infrared (NIR) light to the red band, red light to the green band, and green light to the blue band, identifying vegetation as bright purple because vegetation strongly reflects NIR and green light. Even if a human cannot see NIR light, sensors from satellites and other remote sensing platforms still detect the reflectance of non-visible wavelengths, so simply assigning such data to a visible color on software platforms allows the visualization of previously imperceptible data.

====== Pseudocolor ======
Unlike three-band images, pseudocolor images use only one band. The intensity of light within certain wavelength ranges (or one spectral band on a satellite) is initially measured as a two dimensional numerical data array. The data pixels are each associated with an 8-bit intensity value, which is then normalized to a grayscale from 0 to 1. This scale can also apply to other data, such as temperature and elevation, not just light intensity. These data ranges can then be mapped to different color ranges, such as red to blue, yellow to purple, etc. Different color ranges better highlight data variations that are less obvious in grayscale. Raw grayscale images often lack contrast, so more vibrant colors and sharper changes make patterns easier to identify.

==== Hyperspectral Imaging ====
Hyperspectral imaging produces image cubes where each pixel has full spectral information with imaging narrow spectral bands over a contiguous spectral range. Hyperspectral imagers are used in various applications including mineralogy, biology, defence, and environmental measurements. Within the scope of the combat against desertification, remote sensing allows researchers to follow up and monitor risk areas in the long term, to determine desertification factors, to support decision-makers in defining relevant measures of environmental management, and to assess their impacts. Remotely sensed multi- and hyperspectral images can be used for assessing biodiversity at different spatial scales. Since the spectral properties of different plants species are unique, it is possible to get information about properties that relates to biodiversity such as habitat heterogeneity, spectral diversity and plant functional trait. Remote sensing has also been used to detect rare plants to aid in conservation efforts. Prediction, detection, and the ability to record biophysical conditions were possible from medium to very high resolutions. Remote sensing is often utilized in the collection of agricultural and environmental statistics, usually combining classified satellite images with ground truth data collected on a sample selected on an area sampling frame.

==== Geodetic ====
Geodetic remote sensing can be gravimetric or geometric. Overhead gravity data collection was first used in aerial submarine detection. This data revealed minute perturbations in the Earth's gravitational field that may be used to determine changes in the mass distribution of the Earth, which in turn may be used for geophysical studies, as in GRACE. Geometric remote sensing includes position and deformation imaging using InSAR, LIDAR, etc.

==== Acoustic and near-acoustic ====
Three main types of acoustic and near-acoustic remote sensing exist: Sonar – passive sonar, listening for the sound made by another object (a vessel, a whale etc.); active sonar, emitting pulses of sounds and listening for echoes, used for detecting, ranging and measurements of underwater objects and terrain. Seismograms taken at different locations can locate and measure earthquakes (after they occur) by comparing the relative intensity and precise timings. Ultrasound acoustic sensing is made up of ultrasound sensors that emit high-frequency pulses and listening for echoes, used for detecting water waves and water level, as in tide gauges or for towing tanks.

To coordinate a series of large-scale observations, most sensing systems depend on the following: platform location and the orientation of the sensor. High-end instruments now often use positional information from satellite navigation systems. The rotation and orientation are often provided within a degree or two with electronic compasses. Compasses can measure not just azimuth (i. e. degrees to magnetic north), but also altitude (degrees above the horizon), since the magnetic field curves into the Earth at different angles at different latitudes. More exact orientations require gyroscopic-aided orientation, periodically realigned by different methods including navigation from stars or known benchmarks.

==== Gamma rays ====
There are applications of gamma rays to mineral exploration through remote sensing. In 1972 more than $2 million were spent on remote sensing applications with gamma rays to mineral exploration. Gamma rays are used to search for deposits of uranium. By observing radioactivity from potassium, porphyry copper deposits can be located. A high ratio of uranium to thorium has been found to be related to the presence of hydrothermal copper deposits. Radiation patterns have also been known to occur above oil and gas fields, but some of these patterns were thought to be due to surface soils instead of oil and gas.

==== Land Cover Statistics and Reference Data ====
Satellite images provide very useful information to produce statistics on topics closely related to the territory, such as agriculture, forestry or land cover in general. The first large project to apply Landsat 1 images for statistics was LACIE (Large Area Crop Inventory Experiment), run by NASA, NOAA and the USDA in 1974–77. Many other application projects on crop area estimation have followed, including the Italian AGRIT project and the MARS project of the Joint Research Centre (JRC) of the European Commission. Forest area and deforestation estimation have also been a frequent target of remote sensing projects, the same as land cover and land use

Ground truth or reference data to train and validate image classification require a field survey if we are targeting annual crops or individual forest species, but may be substituted by photointerpretation if we look at wider classes that can be reliably identified on aerial photos or satellite images. It is relevant to highlight that probabilistic sampling is not critical for the selection of training pixels for image classification, but it is necessary for accuracy assessment of the classified images and area estimation. Additional care is recommended to ensure that training and validation datasets are not spatially correlated.

We suppose now that we have classified images or a land cover map produced by visual photo-interpretation, with a legend of mapped classes that suits our purpose, taking again the example of wheat. The straightforward approach is counting the number of pixels classified as wheat and multiplying by the area of each pixel. Many authors have noticed that estimator is that it is generally biased because commission and omission errors in a confusion matrix do not compensate each other

The main strength of classified satellite images or other indicators computed on satellite images is providing cheap information on the whole target area or most of it. This information usually has a good correlation with the target variable (ground truth) that is usually expensive to observe in an unbiased and accurate way. Therefore, it can be observed on a probabilistic sample selected on an area sampling frame. Traditional survey methodology provides different methods to combine accurate information on a sample with less accurate, but exhaustive, data for a covariable or proxy that is cheaper to collect. For agricultural statistics, field surveys are usually required, while photo-interpretation may better for land cover classes that can be reliably identified on aerial photographs or high resolution satellite images. Additional uncertainty can appear because of imperfect reference data (ground truth or similar).

Some options are: ratio estimator, regression estimator, calibration estimators and small area estimators

If we target other variables, such as crop yield or leaf area, we may need different indicators to be computed from images, such as the NDVI, a good proxy to chlorophyll activity.

==== Hydrology ====
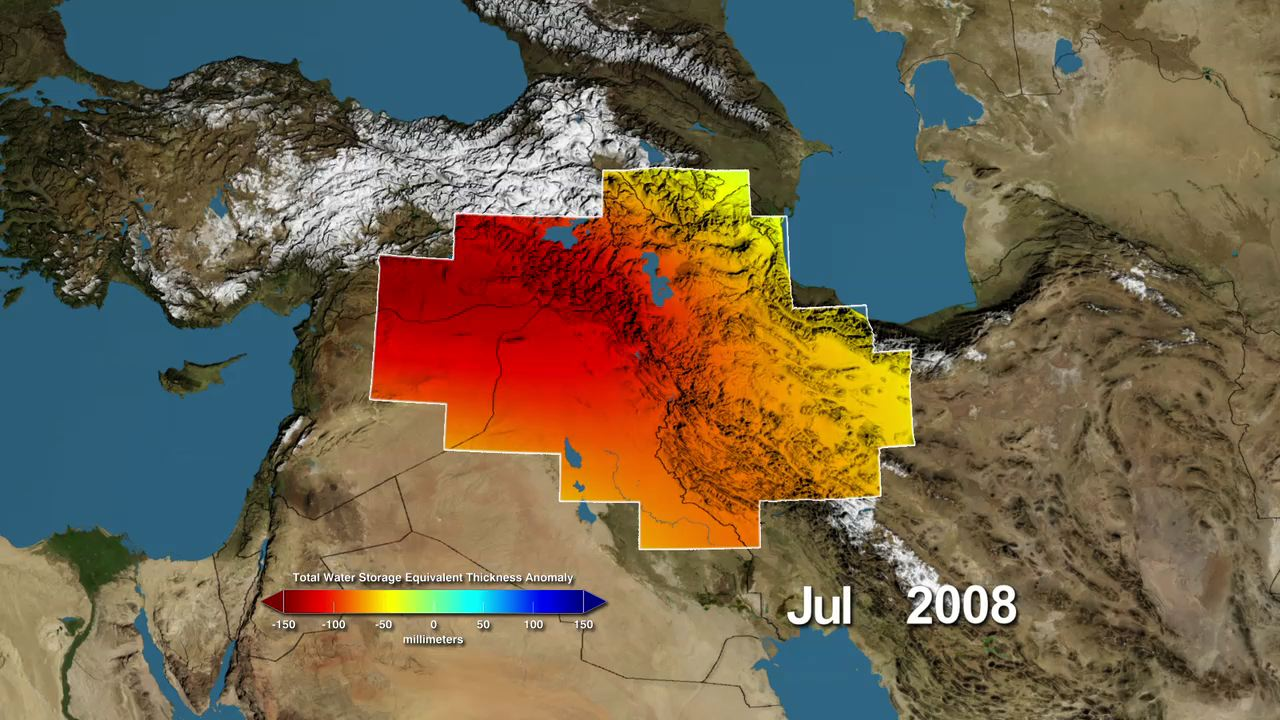
Estimates of changes in water storage around the Tigris and Euphrates Rivers, measured by NASA's GRACE satellites. The satellites measure tiny changes in gravitational acceleration, which can then be processed to reveal movement of water due to changes in its total mass.

Remote sensing of hydrologic processes can provide information on locations where in situ sensors may be unavailable or sparse. It also enables observations over large spatial extents. Many of the variables constituting the terrestrial water balance, for example surface water storage, soil moisture, precipitation, evapotranspiration, and snow and ice, are measurable using remote sensing at various spatial-temporal resolutions and accuracies. Sources of remote sensing include land-based sensors, airborne sensors and satellite sensors which can capture microwave, thermal and near-infrared data or use lidar, for example.

== Data characteristics ==
The quality of remote sensing data consists of its spatial, spectral, radiometric and temporal resolutions.

Spatial resolution
The size of a pixel that is recorded in a raster image – typically pixels may correspond to square areas ranging in side length from 1 to 1,000 metres (3.3 to 3,280.8 ft).
Spectral resolution
The bandwidth of the different frequency bands recorded – usually, this is related to the number of frequency bands recorded by the platform. Current Landsat collection is that of seven bands, including several in the infrared spectrum, ranging from a spectral resolution of 0.7 to 2.1 μm. The Hyperion sensor on Earth Observing-1 resolves 220 bands from 0.4 to 2.5 μm, with a spectral resolution of 0.10 to 0.11 μm per band.
Radiometric resolution
The number of different intensities of radiation the sensor is able to distinguish. Typically, this ranges from 8 to 14 bits, corresponding to 256 levels of the gray scale and up to 16,384 intensities or "shades" of colour, in each band. It also depends on the instrument noise.
Temporal resolution
The frequency of flyovers by the satellite or plane, and is only relevant in time-series studies or those requiring an averaged or mosaic image as in deforesting monitoring. This was first used by the intelligence community where repeated coverage revealed changes in infrastructure, the deployment of units or the modification/introduction of equipment. Cloud cover over a given area or object makes it necessary to repeat the collection of said location.

== Data processing ==
In order to create sensor-based maps, most remote sensing systems expect to extrapolate sensor data in relation to a reference point including distances between known points on the ground. This depends on the type of sensor used. For example, in conventional photographs, distances are accurate in the center of the image, with the distortion of measurements increasing the farther you get from the center. Another factor is that of the platen against which the film is pressed can cause severe errors when photographs are used to measure ground distances. The step in which this problem is resolved is called georeferencing and involves computer-aided matching of points in the image (typically 30 or more points per image) which is extrapolated with the use of an established benchmark, "warping" the image to produce accurate spatial data. As of the early 1990s, most satellite images are sold fully georeferenced.

In addition, images may need to be radiometrically and atmospherically corrected.

Radiometric correction
Allows avoidance of radiometric errors and distortions. The illumination of objects on the Earth's surface is uneven because of different properties of the relief. This factor is taken into account in the method of radiometric distortion correction. Radiometric correction gives a scale to the pixel values, e. g. the monochromatic scale of 0 to 255 will be converted to actual radiance values.
Topographic correction (also called terrain correction)
In rugged mountains, as a result of terrain, the effective illumination of pixels varies considerably. In a remote sensing image, the pixel on the shady slope receives weak illumination and has a low radiance value, in contrast, the pixel on the sunny slope receives strong illumination and has a high radiance value. For the same object, the pixel radiance value on the shady slope will be different from that on the sunny slope. Additionally, different objects may have similar radiance values. These ambiguities seriously affected remote sensing image information extraction accuracy in mountainous areas. It became the main obstacle to the further application of remote sensing images. The purpose of topographic correction is to eliminate this effect, recovering the true reflectivity or radiance of objects in horizontal conditions. It is the premise of quantitative remote sensing application.
Atmospheric correction
Elimination of atmospheric haze by rescaling each frequency band so that its minimum value (usually realised in water bodies) corresponds to a pixel value of 0. The digitizing of data also makes it possible to manipulate the data by changing gray-scale values.

Interpretation is the critical process of making sense of the data. The first application was that of aerial photographic collection which used the following process; spatial measurement through the use of a light table in both conventional single or stereographic coverage, added skills such as the use of photogrammetry, the use of photomosaics, repeat coverage, Making use of objects' known dimensions in order to detect modifications. Image Analysis is the recently developed automated computer-aided application that is in increasing use.

Object-Based Image Analysis (OBIA) is a sub-discipline of GI-Science devoted to partitioning remote sensing (RS) imagery into meaningful image-objects, and assessing their characteristics through spatial, spectral and temporal scale.

Old data from remote sensing is often valuable because it may provide the only long-term data for a large extent of geography. At the same time, the data is often complex to interpret, and bulky to store. Modern systems tend to store the data digitally, often with lossless compression. The difficulty with this approach is that the data is fragile, the format may be archaic, and the data may be easy to falsify. One of the best systems for archiving data series is as computer-generated machine-readable ultrafiche, usually in typefonts such as OCR-B, or as digitized half-tone images. Ultrafiches survive well in standard libraries, with lifetimes of several centuries. They can be created, copied, filed and retrieved by automated systems. They are about as compact as archival magnetic media, and yet can be read by human beings with minimal, standardized equipment.

Generally speaking, remote sensing works on the principle of the inverse problem: while the object or phenomenon of interest (the state) may not be directly measured, there exists some other variable that can be detected and measured (the observation) which may be related to the object of interest through a calculation. The common analogy given to describe this is trying to determine the type of animal from its footprints. For example, while it is impossible to directly measure temperatures in the upper atmosphere, it is possible to measure the spectral emissions from a known chemical species (such as carbon dioxide) in that region. The frequency of the emissions may then be related via thermodynamics to the temperature in that region.

=== Data processing levels ===
To facilitate the discussion of data processing in practice, several processing "levels" were first defined in 1986 by NASA as part of its Earth Observing System and steadily adopted since then, both internally at NASA (e. g.,) and elsewhere (e. g.,); these definitions are:

Level	Description
0	Reconstructed, unprocessed instrument and payload data at full resolution, with any and all communications artifacts (e. g., synchronization frames, communications headers, duplicate data) removed.
1a	Reconstructed, unprocessed instrument data at full resolution, time-referenced, and annotated with ancillary information, including radiometric and geometric calibration coefficients and georeferencing parameters (e. g., platform ephemeris) computed and appended but not applied to the Level 0 data (or if applied, in a manner that level 0 is fully recoverable from level 1a data).
1b	Level 1a data that have been processed to sensor units (e. g., radar backscatter cross section, brightness temperature, etc.); not all instruments have Level 1b data; level 0 data is not recoverable from level 1b data.
2	Derived geophysical variables (e. g., ocean wave height, soil moisture, ice concentration) at the same resolution and location as Level 1 source data.
3	Variables mapped on uniform spacetime grid scales, usually with some completeness and consistency (e. g., missing points interpolated, complete regions mosaicked together from multiple orbits, etc.).
4	Model output or results from analyses of lower level data (i. e., variables that were not measured by the instruments but instead are derived from these measurements).

A Level 1 data record is the most fundamental (i. e., highest reversible level) data record that has significant scientific utility, and is the foundation upon which all subsequent data sets are produced. Level 2 is the first level that is directly usable for most scientific applications; its value is much greater than the lower levels. Level 2 data sets tend to be less voluminous than Level 1 data because they have been reduced temporally, spatially, or spectrally. Level 3 data sets are generally smaller than lower level data sets and thus can be dealt with without incurring a great deal of data handling overhead. These data tend to be generally more useful for many applications. The regular spatial and temporal organization of Level 3 datasets makes it feasible to readily combine data from different sources.

While these processing levels are particularly suitable for typical satellite data processing pipelines, other data level vocabularies have been defined and may be appropriate for more heterogeneous workflows.

Analysis-ready data is a form of satellite data which has been pre-processed for immediate data analysis, such as data cubes for time series analysis.

== History ==
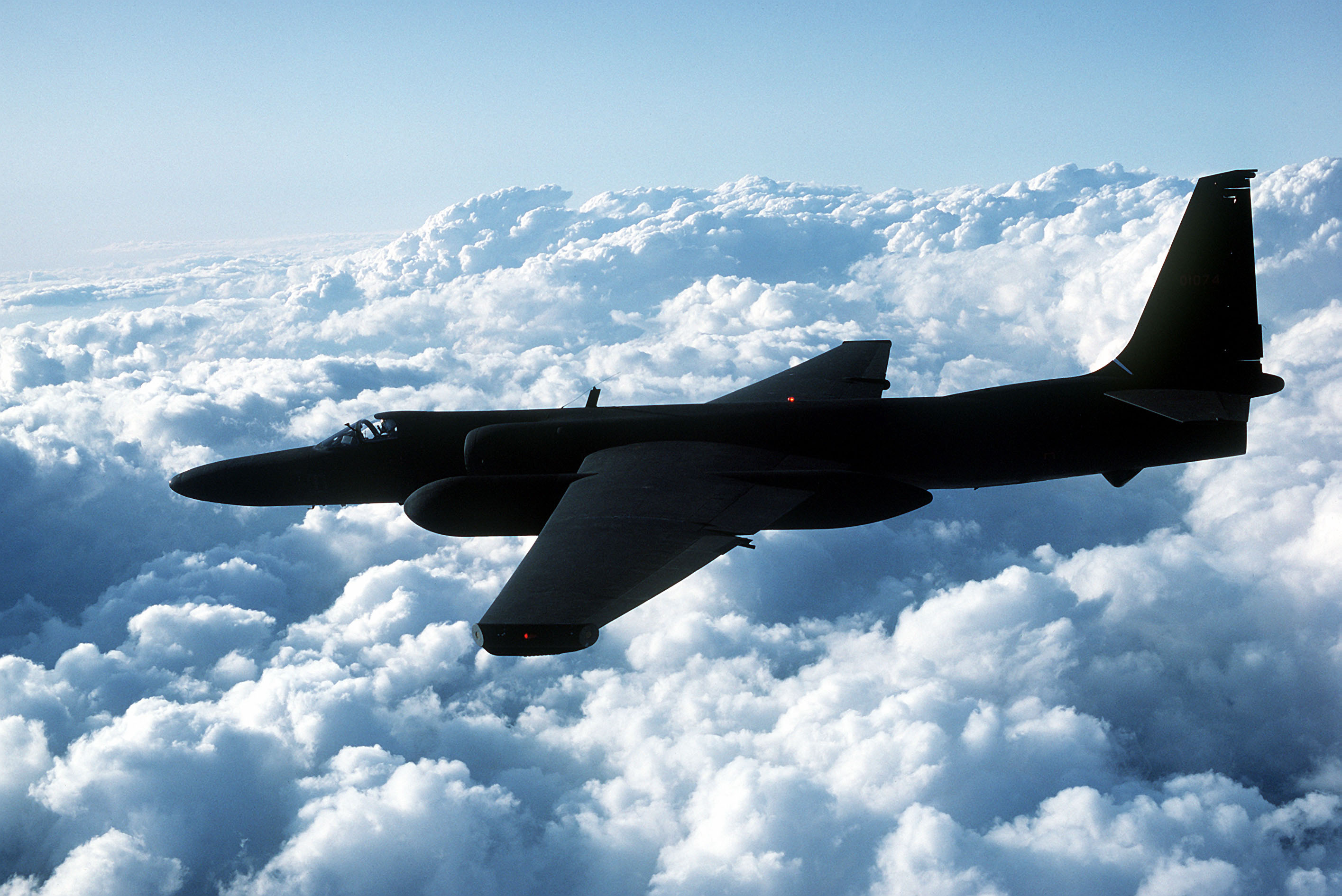
The TR-1 reconnaissance/surveillance aircraft

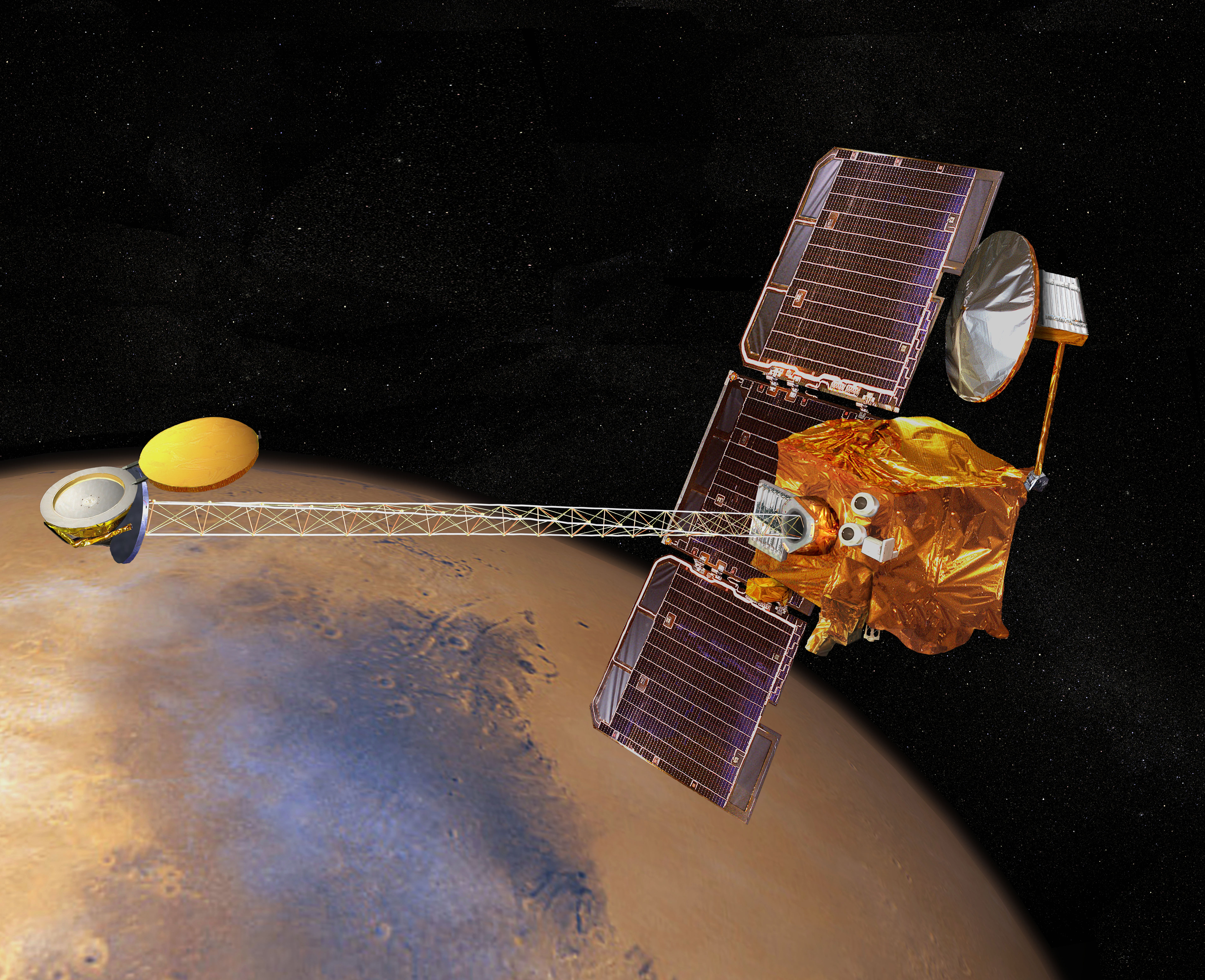
The 2001 Mars Odyssey used spectrometers and imagers to hunt for evidence of past or present water and volcanic activity on Mars.

The modern discipline of remote sensing arose with the development of flight. The balloonist G. Tournachon (alias Nadar) made photographs of Paris from his balloon in 1858. Messenger pigeons, kites, rockets and unmanned balloons were also used for early images. With the exception of balloons, these first, individual images were not particularly useful for map making or for scientific purposes.

Systematic aerial photography was developed for military surveillance and reconnaissance purposes beginning in World War I. After WWI, remote sensing technology was quickly adapted to civilian applications. This is demonstrated by the first line of a 1941 textbook titled "Aerophotography and Aerosurverying," which stated the following:

"There is no longer any need to preach for aerial photography-not in the United States- for so widespread has become its use and so great its value that even the farmer who plants his fields in a remote corner of the country knows its value."

— James Bagley

The development of remote sensing technology reached a climax during the Cold War with the use of modified combat aircraft such as the P-51, P-38, RB-66 and the F-4C, or specifically designed collection platforms such as the U2/TR-1, SR-71, A-5 and the OV-1 series both in overhead and stand-off collection. A more recent development is that of increasingly smaller sensor pods such as those used by law enforcement and the military, in both manned and unmanned platforms. The advantage of this approach is that this requires minimal modification to a given airframe. Later imaging technologies would include infrared, conventional, Doppler and synthetic aperture radar.

The development of artificial satellites in the latter half of the 20th century allowed remote sensing to progress to a global scale as of the end of the Cold War. Instrumentation aboard various Earth observing and weather satellites such as Landsat, the Nimbus and more recent missions such as RADARSAT and UARS provided global measurements of various data for civil, research, and military purposes. Space probes to other planets have also provided the opportunity to conduct remote sensing studies in extraterrestrial environments, synthetic aperture radar aboard the Magellan spacecraft provided detailed topographic maps of Venus, while instruments aboard SOHO allowed studies to be performed on the Sun and the solar wind, just to name a few examples.

Recent developments include, beginning in the 1960s and 1970s, the development of image processing of satellite imagery. The use of the term "remote sensing" began in the early 1960s when Evelyn Pruitt realized that advances in science meant that aerial photography was no longer an adequate term to describe the data streams being generated by new technologies. With assistance from her fellow staff member at the Office of Naval Research, Walter Bailey, she coined the term "remote sensing". Several research groups in Silicon Valley including NASA Ames Research Center, GTE, and ESL Inc. developed Fourier transform techniques leading to the first notable enhancement of imagery data. In 1999 the first commercial satellite (IKONOS) collecting very high resolution imagery was launched.

== Training and education ==
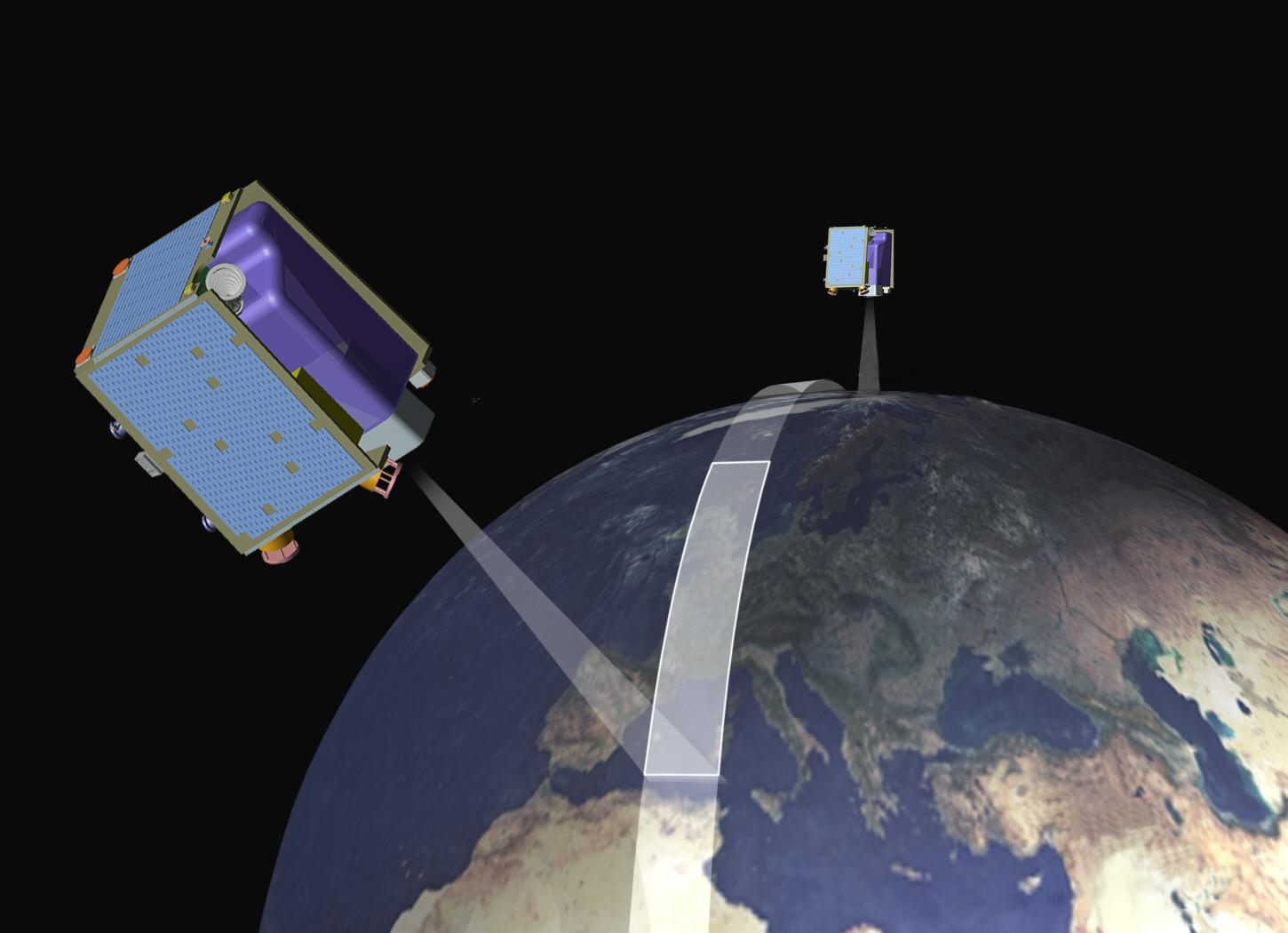
The RapidEye satellite constellation in action around the Earth

Remote sensing has a growing relevance in the modern information society. It represents a key technology as part of the aerospace industry and bears increasing economic relevance – new sensors e.g. TerraSAR-X and RapidEye are developed constantly and the demand for skilled labour is increasing steadily. Furthermore, remote sensing exceedingly influences everyday life, ranging from weather forecasts to reports on climate change or natural disasters. As an example, 80% of the German students use the services of Google Earth; in 2006 alone the software was downloaded 100 million times. But studies have shown that only a fraction of them know more about the data they are working with. There exists a huge knowledge gap between the application and the understanding of satellite images. Remote sensing only plays a tangential role in schools, regardless of the political claims to strengthen the support for teaching on the subject. A lot of the computer software explicitly developed for school lessons has not yet been implemented due to its complexity. Thereby, the subject is either not at all integrated into the curriculum or does not pass the step of an interpretation of analogue images. In fact, the subject of remote sensing requires a consolidation of physics and mathematics as well as competences in the fields of media and methods apart from the mere visual interpretation of satellite images.

Many teachers have great interest in the subject "remote sensing", being motivated to integrate this topic into teaching, provided that the curriculum is considered. In many cases, this encouragement fails because of confusing information. In order to integrate remote sensing in a sustainable manner organizations like the EGU or Digital Earth encourage the development of learning modules and learning portals. Examples include: FIS – Remote Sensing in School Lessons, Geospektiv, Ychange, or Spatial Discovery, to promote media and method qualifications as well as independent learning.

== Software ==
Remote sensing data are processed and analyzed with computer software, known as a remote sensing application. A large number of proprietary and open source applications exist to process remote sensing data.

== Satellites ==
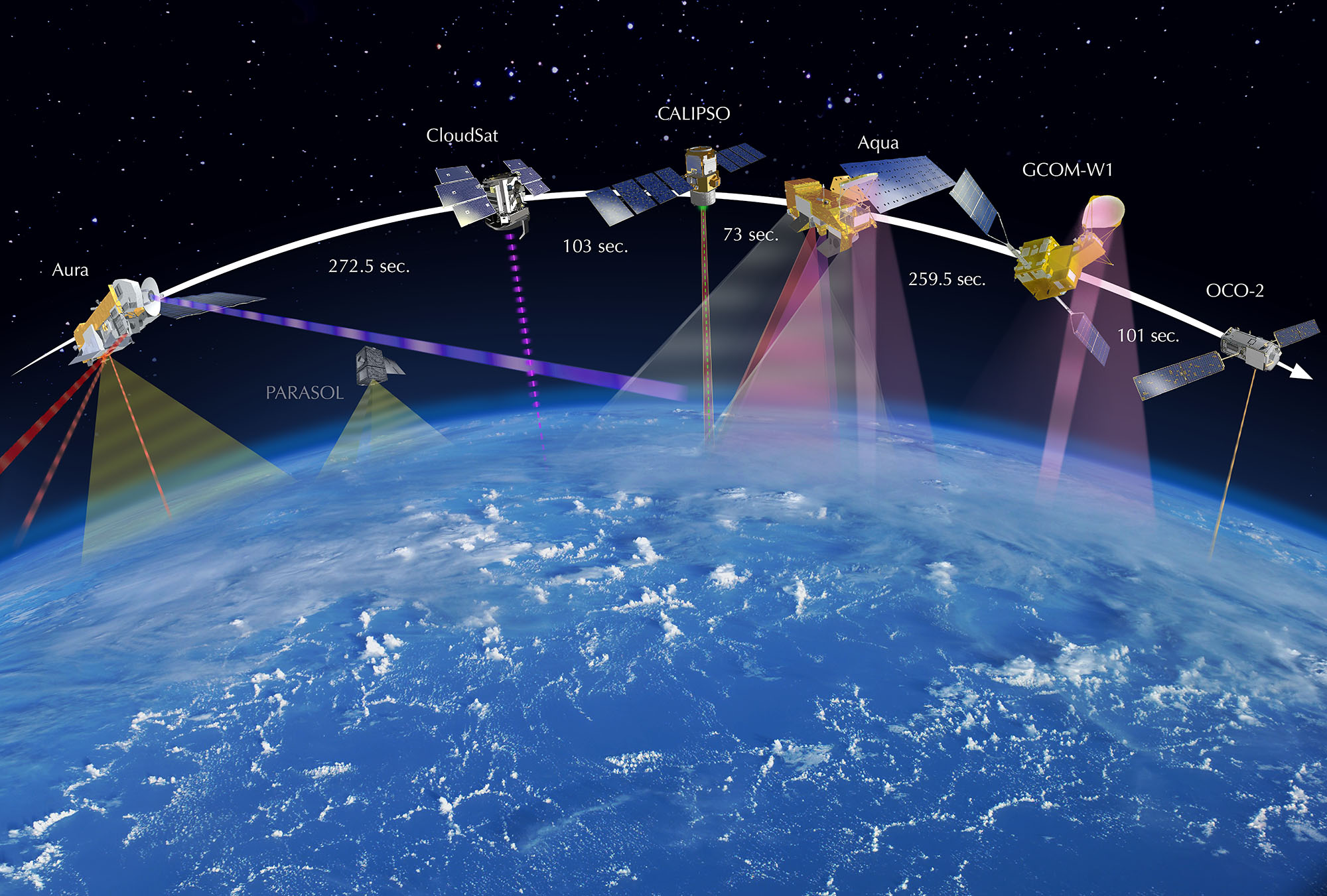
Six Earth observation satellites comprising the A-train satellite constellation as of 2014

An Earth observation satellite or Earth remote sensing satellite is a satellite used or designed for Earth observation (EO) from orbit, including spy satellites and similar ones intended for non-military uses such as environmental monitoring, meteorology, cartography and others. The most common type are Earth imaging satellites, that take satellite images, analogous to aerial photographs; some EO satellites may perform remote sensing without forming pictures, such as in GNSS radio occultation.

The first occurrence of satellite remote sensing can be dated to the launch of the first artificial satellite, Sputnik 1, by the Soviet Union on October 4, 1957. Sputnik 1 sent back radio signals, which scientists used to study the ionosphere.

The United States Army Ballistic Missile Agency launched the first American satellite, Explorer 1, for NASA's Jet Propulsion Laboratory on January 31, 1958. The information sent back from its radiation detector led to the discovery of the Earth's Van Allen radiation belts. The TIROS-1 spacecraft, launched on April 1, 1960, as part of NASA's Television Infrared Observation Satellite (TIROS) program, sent back the first television footage of weather patterns to be taken from space.

In 2008, more than 150 Earth observation satellites were in orbit, recording data with both passive and active sensors and acquiring more than 10 terabits of data daily. By 2021, that total had grown to over 950, with the largest number of satellites operated by US-based company Planet Labs.

Most Earth observation satellites carry instruments that should be operated at a relatively low altitude. Most orbit at altitudes above 500 to 600 kilometers (310 to 370 mi). Lower orbits have significant air-drag, which makes frequent orbit reboost maneuvers necessary. The Earth observation satellites ERS-1, ERS-2 and Envisat of European Space Agency as well as the MetOp spacecraft of EUMETSAT are all operated at altitudes of about 800 km (500 mi). The Proba-1, Proba-2 and SMOS spacecraft of European Space Agency are observing the Earth from an altitude of about 700 km (430 mi). The Earth observation satellites of UAE, DubaiSat-1 & DubaiSat-2 are also placed in Low Earth orbits (LEO) orbits and providing satellite imagery of various parts of the Earth.

To get global coverage with a low orbit, a polar orbit is used. A low orbit will have an orbital period of about 100 minutes and the Earth will rotate around its polar axis about 25° between successive orbits. The ground track moves towards the west 25° each orbit, allowing a different section of the globe to be scanned with each orbit. Most are in Sun-synchronous orbits.

A geostationary orbit, at 36,000 km (22,000 mi), allows a satellite to hover over a constant spot on the earth since the orbital period at this altitude is 24 hours. This allows uninterrupted coverage of more than 1/3 of the Earth per satellite, so three satellites, spaced 120° apart, can cover the whole Earth. This type of orbit is mainly used for meteorological satellites.

== See also ==
- Coastal management – Preventing flooding and erosion of shorelines
- Geophysical survey – Systematic collection of geophysical data for spatial studies
- Land change science – Interdisciplinary study of changes in climate, land use, and land cover
- List of Earth observation satellites
- Normalized difference water index – Remote sensing-derived indexes related to liquid water
- Orthophoto – Geometrically corrected aerial photograph
- Pictometry – Aerial survey technique
- Radiometry – Measurement of electromagnetic radiation (esp. optical radiation)
