= Michael Andrew McConnell =

American swimmer and entrepreneur (born 1981)

Personal information
- National team: USA
- Born: June 24, 1981 (age 45) Birmingham, Alabama, U.S.

Sport
- Sport: Swimming
- College team: Harvard Crimson Swimming

Michael Andrew McConnell (born June 24, 1981) is an American professional swimmer, author, and businessman. He was a member of the USA Open Water Swimming National Team. He won an international bronze medal in 1999 in FINA Swimming World Cup.

He is the CEO of Rented Inc., and the author of The Wall Street Journal Bestseller Get Out of My Head: Creating Modern Clarity with Stoic Wisdom.

== Early life and education ==
McConnell was born in Birmingham, Alabama. In 2003, he received a bachelor's degree in history from Harvard University. In 2006, he completed his LL.M. degree from the University of Cambridge and competed on Cambridge's varsity swim team.

In 2007, he completed his Doctor of Law (JD) degree from Harvard Law School.

== Career ==
In 2020, McConnell was credited as an honoree in the Atlanta Business Chronicle’s 2020 Class of 40 Under Forty.

He acquired Rented Inc. in 2012, which was ranked 4th on the Financial Times rankings of America's Fastest-Growing Companies in 2021.

In 1999, he was a two-time NCAA Division I All-American Honorable Mention.
