= Bing Maps for Enterprise =

Geospatial mapping platform by Microsoft

- Developer: Microsoft
- Release: 2005
- Operating system: Windows
- Type: Virtual globe
- License: Proprietary
- Website: www.microsoft.com/maps/

Bing Maps for Enterprise (previously Microsoft Virtual Earth) is a geospatial mapping platform produced by Microsoft. It allows developers to create applications that layer location-relevant data on top of licensed map imagery. The imagery includes samples taken by satellite sensors, aerial cameras (including 45 degree oblique "bird's eye" aerial imagery licensed from Pictometry International), Streetside imagery, 3D city models and terrain.

It also provides a point-of-interest database including a search capability. Microsoft uses the data to power its Bing Maps and Azure Maps products. It was sunset by Microsoft in May 2024, customers to migrate to the Azure Maps cloud service as an alternative. Free customers were retired by June 2025, and paid customers can access the service till June 30, 2028.

== Features ==
Key features of the Bing Maps for Enterprise platform include:

- Photo-based images with features such as Streetside and 45 degree oblique "bird’s eye" views (nominally including 4 views at 90 degree viewpoint increments) that present data in context while simplifying orientation and navigation.
- The ability to overlay standard or custom data points and layers with different themes.
- Building-level geocoding for more than 70 million addresses in the United States.
- Developer support options available.
- Set of APIs available upon which developers can build applications.

== See also ==
- Apple Maps – Apple's mapping service
- Bing Maps
- Esri – Esri ArcGIS
- FloodAlerts
- Google Maps – Google's mapping service
- MapQuest
- Microsoft Research Maps – public domain (older than five years) satellite imagery via Microsoft servers
- Nokia Maps – Nokia’s mapping service
- OpenStreetMap – OpenStreetMap
- Yahoo! Maps – Yahoo! Map Web Services
