= Quantitative remote sensing =

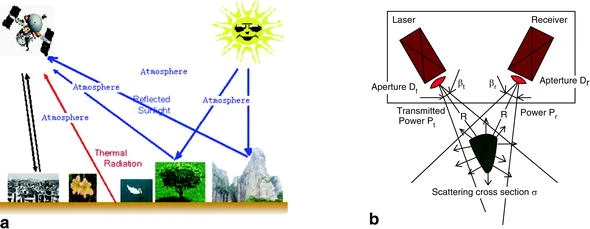
In quantitative remote sensing, the real physical system that couples the atmosphere and the land surface is very complicated. The figure shows remote observing the Earth (a); geometry and parameters for laser scanner (b).

Quantitative remote sensing is a branch of remote sensing. The quantitative remote sensing system does not directly measure land surface parameters of interest. Instead, the signature remote sensors receive is electromagnetic radiation reflected, scattered, and emitted from both the surface and the atmosphere. Both modeling and model-based inversion are important for quantitative remote sensing. Here, modeling mainly refers to data modeling, which is a method used to define and analyze data requirements; model-based inversion mainly refers to using physical or empirically physical models to infer unknown but interested parameters.

== Model-based inversion ==
The inversion algorithm is needed to obtain land surface parameters from remotely sensed data. It is not a trivia task to reliably retrieve land surface parameters since the remote sensing signature is a function of not only the variable of interest but also many other atmosphere and surface characteristics. Multifaceted aspects of the remote sensing data, such as the temporal, spectral, spatial, polarized information, as well as ancillary and prior knowledge, are typically used in a synthetic way to improve the quality of land parameter retrievals. Hundreds of models related to atmosphere, vegetation, and radiation have been established during past decades. The model-based inversion in geophysical (atmospheric) sciences has been well understood. However, the model-based inverse problems for Earth surface received much attention by scientists only in recent years. Compared to modeling, model-based inversion is still in the stage of exploration. This is because that intrinsic difficulties exist in the application of a priori information, inverse strategy, and inverse algorithm. The appearance of hyperspectral and multiangular remote sensor enhanced the exploration means, and provided us more spectral and spatial dimension information than before. However, how to utilize these information to solve the problems faced in quantitative remote sensing to make remote sensing really enter the time of quantification is still an arduous and urgent task for remote sensing scientists.

== Quantitative Models in Optical Remote Sensing ==
All models in optical remote sensing are traditionally grouped into two major categories:

Statistical models: based on correlation relationships of land surface variables and remotely sensed data. They are easy to develop and effective for summarizing local data; however, the developed models are usually site-specific. They also cannot account for cause-effect relationships.

Physical Models: physically based models follow the physical laws of the remote sensing system. They also establish cause and effect relationships. If the initial models do not perform well, we know where to improve by incorporating the latest knowledge and information. However, there is a long curve to develop and learn these physical models. Any models represent the abstract of the reality; thus a realistic model could potentially be very complex with a large number of variables.

== bibliography ==
Liang, S. (2005). Quantitative remote sensing of land surfaces. John Wiley & Sons.
