= FloodAlerts =

Flood tracking app

FloodAlerts is a software application, developed by software specialists Shoothill, which takes real-time flooding information, and displays the data on an interactive Bing map, updating and warning its users when they, their premises or the routes they need to travel could be at risk of flooding.

== History ==
FloodAlerts was launched in 2012, originally as the world's first Facebook flood warning app.

== Operation ==
FloodAlerts is made available free of charge to individuals. Users are able to set up their own monitored locations and receive alerts via the application or their Facebook wall if the locations they are monitoring are at imminent risk of flooding.

Hosted in the Cloud, using the Microsoft Azure platform, the FloodAlerts application processes the data received from the Environment Agency, automatically creates the required map tiles, pins and alerts and displays them on an interactive Bing map, updating the content every 15 minutes. Users are able to see the latest information on the map without having to refresh their browser.

FloodAlerts can also be provided as a customised risk management solution to businesses that require infrastructure or asset safety monitoring in areas where water levels are rising or receding.

== Awards and recognition ==
FloodAlerts has received The Guardian and Virgin Media Business's 2012 Innovation Nation Awards and was shortlisted as a finalist for a further two national awards: the UK IT Industry Awards for Innovation and Entrepreneurship and The Institution of Engineering and Technology Innovation Awards for Information Technology.

== In the press ==
The FloodAlerts application was reviewed on the BBC website. It was also reviewed on BBC Click.
