= 5Linx =

American multi-level marketing company

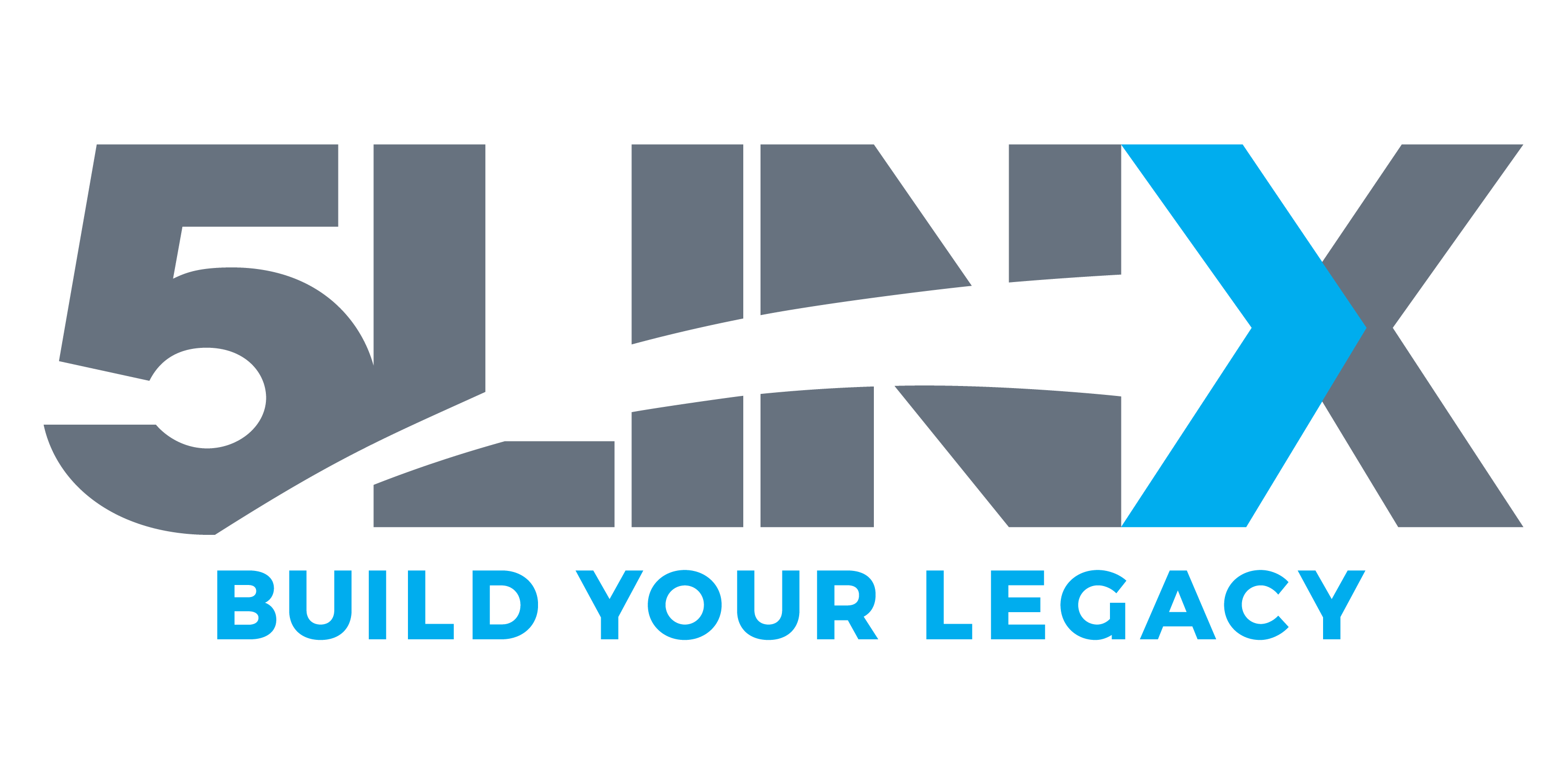
- Type: Private
- Industry: Multi-level marketing
- Founded: 2001
- Headquarters: New York, United States
- Area served: International
- Key people: Nelson Gerard (Chairman) and majority owner (5L Holdings, L.L.C.)
- Products: Home and business services, nutritional supplements
- Services: home security (through Protect America), identity theft protection, electric power, data storage, supplemental healthcare (not insurance)
- Website: 5linx.com

5Linx is an American multi-level marketing company headquartered in Rochester, New York, which offers utility and telecommunication services, health insurance, nutritional supplements, and business services. It was founded in 2001. In 2017, the co-founders of 5LINX, Craig Jerabeck, Jeb Tyler, and Jason Guck, were indicted on multiple federal fraud charges, including wire fraud and money laundering. They admitted to defrauding $2.3 million from investors, illegally depositing company revenues into personal accounts, and failing to pay hundreds of thousands of dollars in taxes. Tyler and Jerabeck were sentenced to 14-month prison terms in December 2018.

== History ==
5LINX Enterprises, Inc. was founded by Craig Jerabek, Jeb Tyler, and Jason Guck. 5Linx was incorporated in Rochester, New York, in 2001. In 2016, 5L Holdings, LLC was formed to acquire the assets of 5 Linx Enterprises (dissolved). In September of the same year, business entrepreneur Nelson Gerard bought the majority stock of 5L Holdings, LLC and became its Chairman. 5Linx is a multi-level marketing company. Representatives are rewarded for recruiting additional representatives in addition to products and services sold. Sales representatives are independent contractors, and the company does not make any claims about potential income.

As of 2015, Cook County Circuit Court Clerk Dorothy A. Brown was a senior vice president and spokesperson for 5LINX. Illinois State Senator Patricia Van Pelt Watkins was also a high-ranking representative until she left the company for a different multi-level marketing firm.

5Linx was on the Inc. 500 list of fastest growing companies from 2006 until 2009. The company remained on the Inc. 5000 list as of 2014. In 2009 5Linx was ranked on the Rochester Top 100 list as the 2nd fastest growing company in the region. The company also made the list the following three years.

In May 2015, the company sold its telecommunications branch to Birch Communications, which reduced the company's revenue by about 30%. Farshad Tafazzoli was named President in 2016.

== Litigation ==
In September 2015, the new management of the 5LINX sued Craig Jerabeck, 5LINX Enterprises' former CEO, alleging that he breached his contract with the company by poaching 5LINX representatives for other network marketing companies.

In September 2017, the three co-founders of 5LINX - Jerabeck, Tyler, and Guck - were indicted on multiple federal fraud charges, including wire fraud and money laundering. The trio admitted to defrauding $2.3 million from investors, illegally depositing company revenues into personal accounts, and failing to pay hundreds of thousands of dollars in taxes. In December 2018, Tyler and Jerabeck were sentenced to a 14-month prison term for fraud and filing false tax returns and were ordered to pay back $2.3 million in restitution to investors, as well as $118,628 in unpaid taxes to the IRS. In May 2019, Jason Guck was sentenced to a 7-month prison term.
