= Peachtree-Pine shelter =

Homeless shelter in Atlanta, Georgia, United States

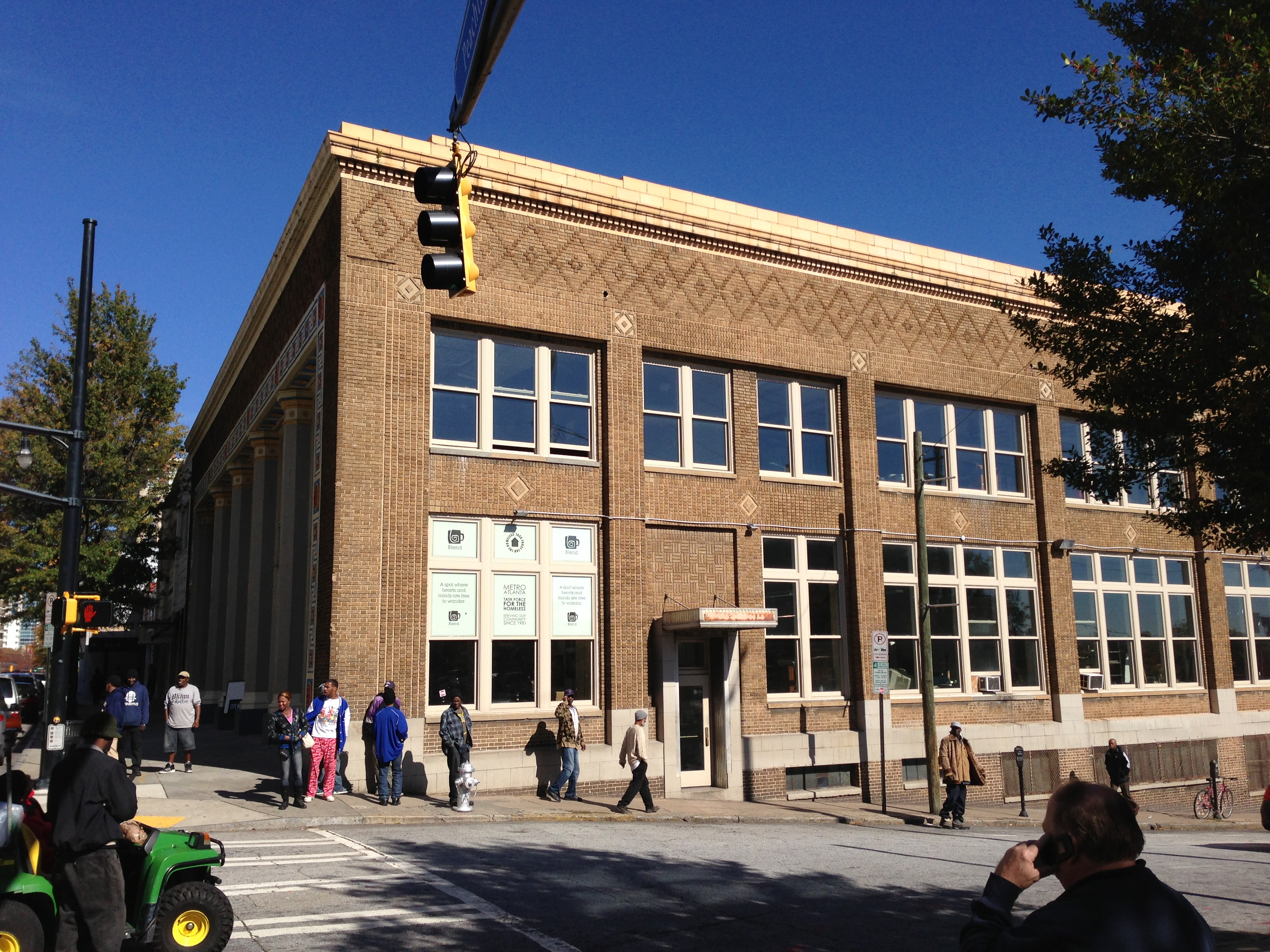
Peachtree-Pine homeless shelter, east end of north facade on Pine Street

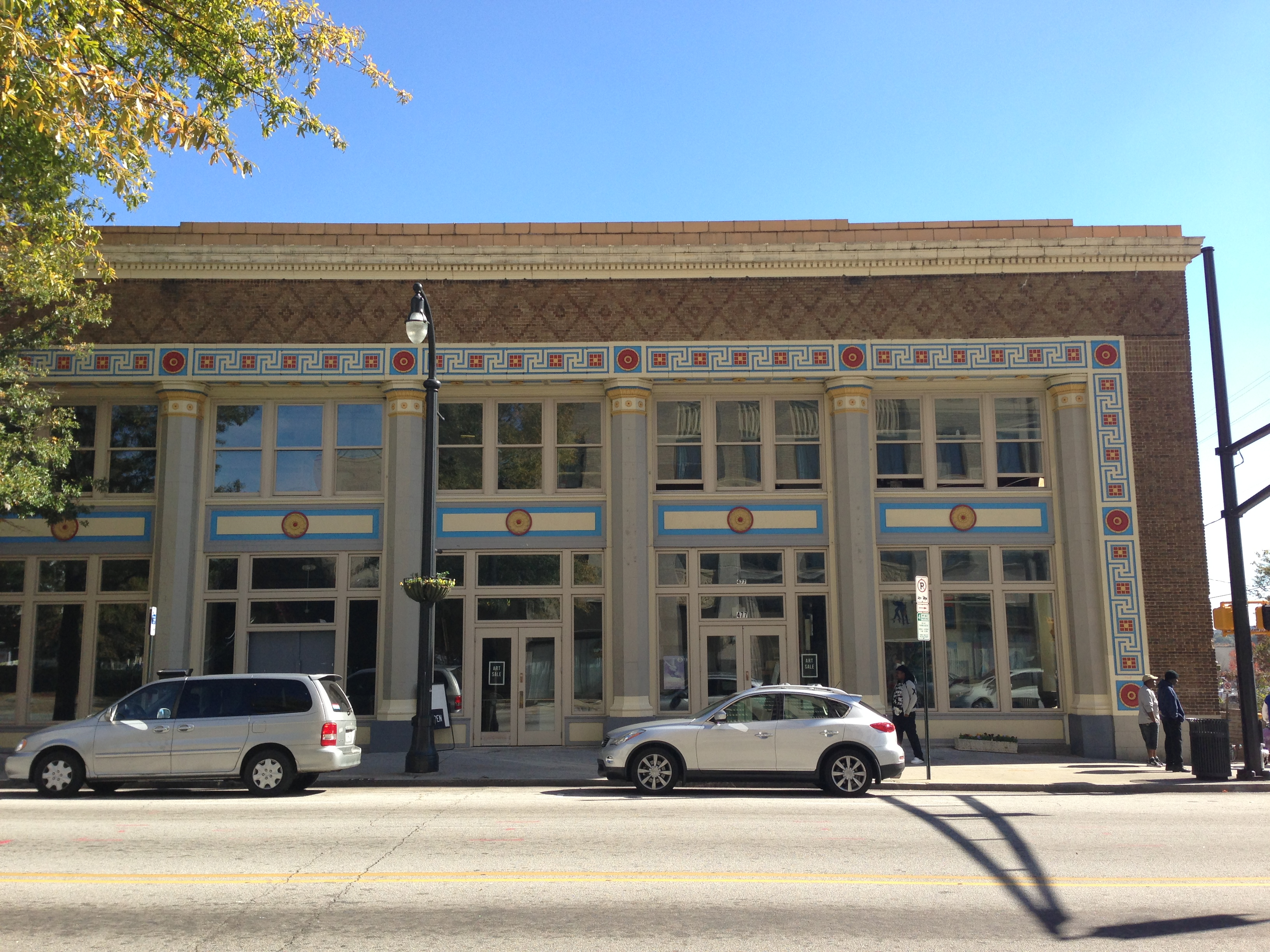
Peachtree-Pine homeless shelter, front facade on Peachtree Street

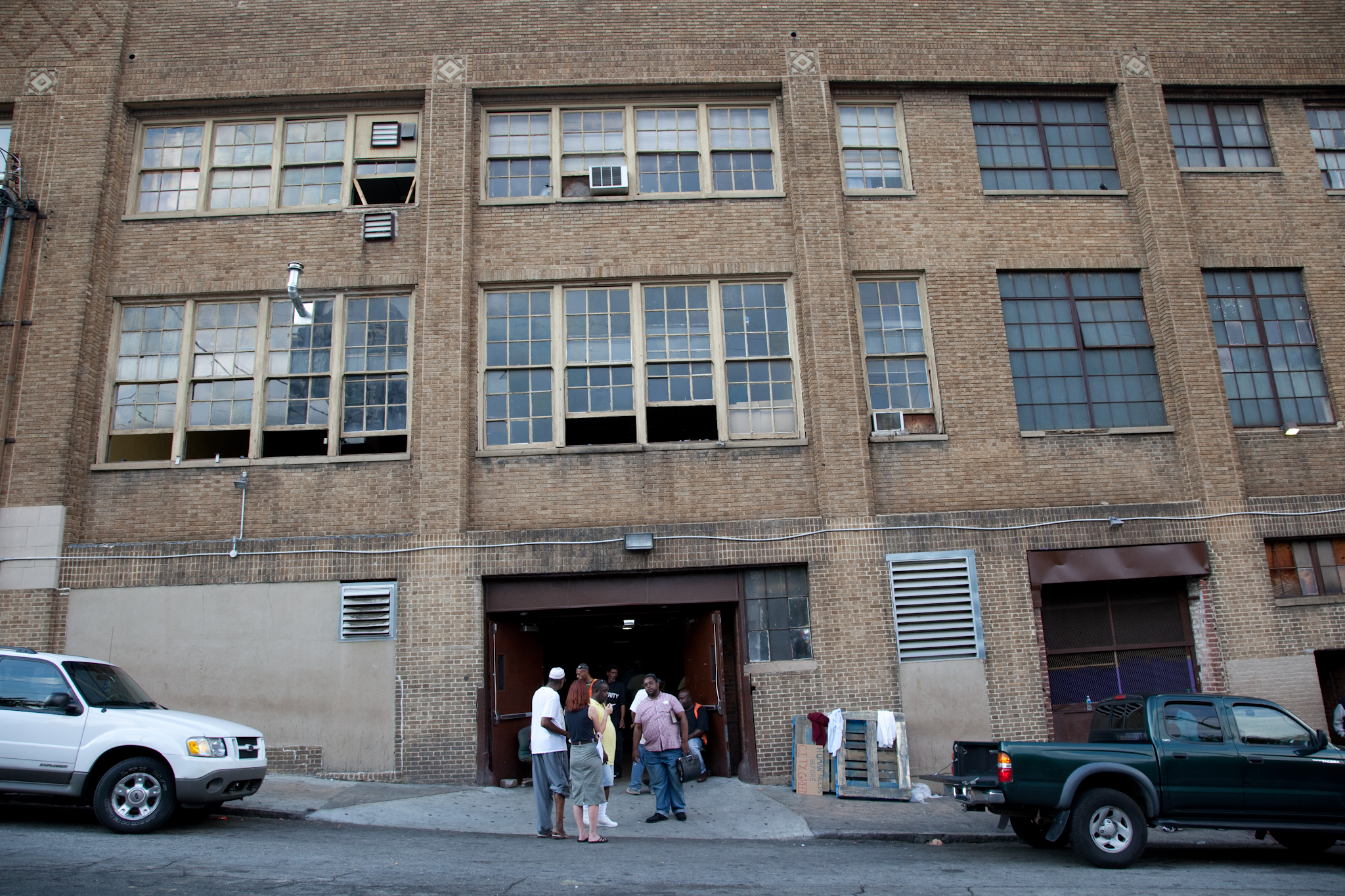
View of shelter along Pine Street

The Peachtree-Pine homeless shelter was located at 477 Peachtree Street NE, at the corner of Pine Street in the SoNo subdistrict of Downtown Atlanta, Georgia, United States, just south of Midtown. It was officially closed on August 28, 2017, after many years of political wrangling over the site and its management. The 100,000 square feet (9,300 m^{2}) building, which is within sight of Fox Theatre and Bank of America Plaza, stretches from Peachtree Street in the front to Courtland Street in the back. It was run by the Metro Atlanta Task Force for the Homeless, whose executive director was Anita Beaty. The facility could house up to 700 homeless men each night, although some sources say it could house up to 1000.

Almost since its opening in 1997, neighbors and neighborhood organizations complained about unsanitary conditions, loitering, drug sales, and violent crimes in the immediate vicinity of the shelter, to a degree far more intense than occurs around other shelters in the city, blaming poor management of Peachtree-Pine as the root cause. The shelter was also the site of tuberculosis outbreaks. In 2014, Mayor Kasim Reed declared that "Peachtree-Pine is awful. It has rampant drug sales, and it poses a serious risk to the health of people in the City of Atlanta". The Task Force, on the other hand, has filed multiple lawsuits accusing the city officials, downtown business organizations, and Emory University (which operates a hospital across from the shelter) of having conspired to dry up its funding sources and force it out of business through tortious interference, defamation and other illegal means.

The shelter's troubled relations with the surrounding community, including its long running legal battles with the City Hall and other organizations, have been covered extensively in local publications such as The Atlanta Journal-Constitution, Creative Loafing, and Atlanta Business Chronicle. There have also been in depth reports in national media.

The building itself was designed by notable Atlanta architect A. Ten Eyck Brown and was originally known as the United Motors Service Building when it opened in 1921.

== History ==
=== Establishment ===
Coca-Cola heiress Ednabelle Wardlaw bought the building, which had been an automotive parts warehouse, in 1997 for $1.3 million and donated it to the Task Force. The Task Force had been only an advocacy and referral agency for the homeless up to that point, but transitioned into providing direct care after acquiring the building. According to the "Mission & History" section of its website, the Peachtree-Pine is the largest homeless facility in Southeast United States, and no one needing shelter is turned away.

=== Sources of Financial Support ===
The shelter's top benefactor and supporter has been William C. Wardlaw III, better known as B Wardlaw, who is the son of Ednabelle Wardlaw. A large Coca-Cola share holder and political activist, Wardlaw has chronicled his support of the Task Force in his memoirs "Coca-Cola Anarchist" and on his website. According to American Bar Association Journal, "Even in hard times, Wardlaw has continued subsistence funding of the shelter and pays salaries of $52,000 each to the Beatys (Anita Beaty and her husband Jim Beaty) through a charitable trust. Without his help, the shelter likely would have gone out of business long ago".

Another major private donor of Peachtree-Pine has been Bob Cramer, a well-known Atlanta entrepreneur and CEO of several tech companies, who was the chairman of the board of the Task Force from 1986 until 2010. In 2010, Cramer penned a letter to the Atlanta Business Chronicle in defense of the shelter and called on the business community to "call off the dogs". Cramer's other public writings on the shelter include an op-ed piece in the Atlanta Journal and a comment in Creative Loafing.

The Task Force also relies on "anonymous donors" whose identities are kept confidential because according to Beaty "business leaders have put pressure against their contributors in the past", and "public officials have told their donors they wouldn't be able to do business with the city if they gave money to the Task Force."

Up to 2007, the shelter was also a recipient of public funds from the state and U.S. Department of Housing and Urban Development (HUD).

=== Loss of Certification and Public Funds ===
In 2007, the Tri-Jurisdictional Collaborative on Homelessness, composed of appointees from Atlanta and Fulton and DeKalb counties, gave HUD a prioritized list of local homeless agencies that should receive funding. The Task Force was ranked the lowest of 20 agencies, scoring 56 out of 100 points, and has not been a recipient of HUD or other public funds since. Subsequently, the shelter lost a bulk of its private donations as well and its annual budget dropped from a high of $1.8 million to only about $200,000.

The decline in private donations have also been in part due to active opposition by neighborhood organizations. In 2008, for instance, the Whole Foods grocery store on Ponce de Leon Avenue cancelled a fund raising for the shelter after the Midtown Ponce Security Alliance had threatened the store with boycott.

=== Water Dispute with City ===
In late 2008 the City of Atlanta shut off water service to the shelter because of more than $160,000 in unpaid water and sewer bills. The Task Force won an injunction to have water service restored and also sued the city, claiming the city had been using a multi-pronged approach to try to close the shelter. A federal judge dismissed the suit in September 2011, but the shelter appealed to the Eleventh Circuit Court of Appeals, which in January 2013 also denied the suit.

In September 2014, the shelter's debt to the city stood at close to $600,000 due to unpaid water bills since 2010. This amount was eventually paid in full by "anonymous donors" on September 26, 2014, after the city had declined a partial payment of $100,000 from the Task Force and threatened to cut off water.

=== Foreclosure of Building ===
In 2007, when the shelter's funding had begun to deteriorate, the building had been estimated to be worth $9 million or more by Alan Wexler, president of real estate research firm Databank Inc. Thus some observers, such as city councilman Kwanza Hall, who represents nearby neighborhoods, had expected the Task Force to sell the property. "With the amount of money that they could get for that building, they could invest in a facility that could really help people who need help", Hall had said. However, Bob Cramer, who was then the chairman of the board of directors of Peachtree-Pine, stated that there's "not enough money at Fort Knox" to get the task force to move the shelter.

On the other hand, the Task Force had taken out three mortgages on the property, which it did not pay back. With $900,000 outstanding on the mortgages, and Wardlaw not being able to pay off the shelter's debt, two of the lenders foreclosed in May 2010, and the building was bought by Ichthus Community Trust, which was controlled by Norcross-based commercial developer Manny Fialkow". Later, the title was transferred to Premium Funding Solutions, where Fialkow's wife is a silent investor.

After acquiring the building, in an op-ed piece in The Atlanta Journal-Constitution, Fialkow stated that he had "no intentions to immediately alter the use of the property", and pledged that Ichtus Community Trust "would take care of the men who are there" with the goal of finding "appropriate housing with case management for everyone". He only required that the Task Force's director, Anita Beaty, to leave so that Ichtus can begin its work. Beaty, however, refused to leave and the Task Force has continued to operate the shelter without paying rent, while filing lawsuits disputing the ownership of the building.

In a rally in front of the shelter in 2010, Wardlaw declared that "The building of Peachtree-Pine belongs to the Peachtree-Pine community and will remain so."

=== Eviction Order and Dispute Over Rent ===
In 2012, Fulton County Superior Court Judge Craig Schwall ordered the Task Force to hand over the control of the shelter to United Way of America. He criticized the Beatys for having made a "political statement" by allowing the Occupy Atlanta demonstrators to stay at Peachtree-Pine, and questioned their sincerity in maintaining that the homeless were their primary concern.

The Beatys' actions were "more about power, money, control, revenge and anger than it is about the homeless", he declared. Schwall also declined to consider the evidence that the Task Force had gathered in support of its allegations with regard to the conspiracy leading to its loss of ownership of the building. Shortly afterward, however, the Georgia Court of Appeals blocked the eviction of the Task Force, and sent the case back to Schwall so that the Task Force may present its evidence.

Another issue in the various lawsuits in which the Task Force is party is a failure to pay rent on the property from 2010 to date. In 2014 Schwall ruled that Premium Funding Solutions can begin to take action in court to evict the shelter from which it has not been receiving rent since it bought the property in 2011.

In June 2015, various appeals filed by both parties reached the Georgia Supreme Court, which stated that it would issue its rulings in the following September or October.

=== Outbreaks of Tuberculosis ===
Between 2006 and 2014 three separate outbreaks of TB have been reported at the shelter. In August 2015, Mayor Kasim Reed declared that "Peachtree and Pine is one of the leading sites for tuberculosis in the nation" citing communications with the Centers for Disease Control and Prevention. Further he stated that he would invoke eminent domain to close the shelter and move its occupants to a new facility constructed by the city, while the Peachtree-Pine building would be converted to police and fire stations.

=== Closure and Sale of Building ===
In August 2017, after settling the pending lawsuits, the Task Force closed the shelter. The last residents were relocated to apartments or other facilities by December 2017. In January 2019, the building was sold to Emory University. Emory's Midtown hospital is across Peachtree Street from the former shelter.

As of July 23, 2022, the building has had all of its exterior windows covered with plywood in an attempt to make the building more secure.
