= Rochester Top 100 =

The Rochester Top 100 is an annual list of the fastest growing privately held companies in the Rochester, New York region. It is published by the Rochester Business Alliance, a regional chamber of commerce whose members include area companies such as Bausch & Lomb, Constellation Brands, Eastman Kodak, Genesee Brewing Company, and Xerox. The 2011 list marked the 25th anniversary of the Rochester Top 100.

In 2011, 10 companies in the Rochester Top 100 were owned by women, four were owned by minorities. The number of companies in the Rochester Top 100 devoted to manufacturing doubled in 2011, to 22 from just 11 in 2010.

== Methodology ==
To be eligible for inclusion, companies must be independently owned and have at least $1 million in revenue for each of the three most recent fiscal years. They must be headquartered one of the following counties in New York State: Monroe, Ontario, Wayne, Livingston, Genesee, Orleans, Wyoming, Seneca or Yates. Rankings take into account both dollar and percentage growth over the three most recent fiscal years.

== The 2011 List ==
No.	Company Name	Industry	Employees	Years on list
1.	Manning & Napier Advisors	Investment Advisor	414	14
2.	RailComm	Software Engineering	64	3
3.	Real Lease	Equipment leasing	8	9
4.	Fibertech Networks	Fiber-optic broadband	240	9
5.	Pictometry International	Aerial imagery	325	4
6.	Systems Management/Planning, Inc.	Information technology management	42	6
7.	Leveraging Technology Solutions LLC	Technology consulting	27	2
8.	Soleo Communications, Inc.	Call processing	85	2
9.	Videk, Inc.	Document management	27	2
10.	MaeTec Power	Electric power	20	1
11.	Stefan Sydor Optics	Optical manufacturing	80	4
12.	DDS Companies	Engineering & construction	220	5
13.	Rochester Optical	Optical manufacturing	178	2
14.	Dixon Schwabl	Advertising	85	7
15.	D4	Computer forensics	105	2
16.	Custom Courier Solutions	Courier	75	2
17.	Diamond Packaging	Packaging	251	12
18.	AutoCrafting	Automobile accessories	20	1
19.	Liberty Pumps	Pump manufacturing	98	11
20.	Gardner Plus Architects	Architecture	16	4
21.	KJT Group	Market research	32	1
22.	Century Mold Company	Plastic injection molding	408	11
23.	Rollison Construction Sales	Construction contractor	5	2
24.	Mindex Technologies	Software Engineering	203	8
25.	C.P. Kelly and Associates	Construction contractor	6	1
26.	Pharos Systems International	Document management	113	4
27.	AdviStor	Information technology management	18	5
28.	Sutherland Global Services	Business process outsourcing	34,000	n/a
29.	Bob Johnson Chevrolet	Car dealership	110	17
30.	Calvary Automation Systems	Automation engineering	166	6
31.	Employee Relations Associates	Recruitment	43	3
32.	Gates Automotive Center	Automotive repair	52	2
33.	iCardiac Technologies	Medical laboratory	29	2
34.	Crosman	Air gun manufacturing	305	7
35.	Pharma-Smart International	Medical equipment	305	7
36.	WebTitle Agency	Property title services	109	3
37.	American Packaging	Packaging	580	7
38.	Butler/Till Media Services	Media agency	65	6
39.	Quality Recruiting	Recruitment	6	2
40.	DeCarolis Truck Rental	Truck rental	507	9
41.	Genesee Regional Bank	Banking	52	4
42.	Regional Computer Recycling & Recovery	Electronics recycling	107	2
43.	Premium Mortgage	Mortgage broker	44	3
44.	L-Tron	Barcode systems	15	1
45.	ADI	Data processing	30	2
46.	Lapp Insulators	Electrical insulation	1,146	6
47.	id Signsystems	Sign manufacturing	12	1
48.	Optimax Systems, Inc	Optical manufacturing	150	3
49.	TLF Graphics	Labeling	130	11
50.	ConServe	Collection agency	382	9
51.	Yellow Page City	Advertising	50	2
52.	Wegmans Food Markets	Supermarket chain	41,000	25
53.	Fisher Associates	Civil engineering	110	2
54.	Synergy Global Solutions	Information technology management	225	15
55.	Auction Direct USA	Car dealership	269	3
56.	Harris Beach	Law firm	425	15
57.	MONAG Apparel	Wholesale apparel	7	2
58.	Impact Technologies	Engineering consultant	110	7
59.	VocalNet	VoIP phone service	10	1
60.	VP Supply	Plumbing products	276	10
61.	Flower City Printing	Commercial Printing	314	9
62.	Lewis Tree Service	Arborist	3,555	16
63.	Orcon Industries	Packaging	85	3
64.	Mech Tech HVAC	HVAC contractor	20	3
65.	Partners + Napier	Advertising	120	5
66.	Erdman Anthony	Civil engineering	300	7
67.	Smith+Associates Architects	Architecture	25	1
68.	SimuTech Group	Simulation software	73	1
69.	Innovative Solutions	Information technology management	50	1
70.	Hammer Packaging	Packaging	385	18
71.	Bene-Care	Insurance broker	38	1
72.	Classic Automation	Industrial control systems	15	3
73.	Layer 8 Group	Information technology management	17	1
74.	Pathfinder Engineers & Architects	Architecture	32	2
75.	Broadstone Real Estate	Property management	34	1
76.	Volvo Rents	Equipment leasing	50	5
77.	Excelsus Solutions	Commercial Printing	22	2
78.	Johnstone Supply of CNY	HVAC equipment	17	1
79.	Cast Industries	Storage equipment	15	1
80.	SPS Medical Supply	Sterlization equipment	75	7
81.	Isaac Heating & Air Conditioning	HVAC contractor	210	4
82.	D3 Engineering	Digital signal processing	22	2
83.	TOPTICA Photonics	Laser manufacturing	11	12
84.	Apollo Optical Systems	Optical manufacturing	28	3
85.	Ovation Payroll	Payroll service bureau	130	5
86.	First American Equipment Finance	Equipment leasing	88	10
87.	Alesco Advisors	Investment Advisor	13	1
88.	ComTec Solutions	Information technology management	23	1
89.	IDI Billing Solutions	Telecommunications billing	159	6
90.	UniLink	Banking equipment	23	7
91.	Integrity Networking Systems	Computer networking	15	2
92.	Rocky Mountain Granite & Marble	Countertop installation	28	1
93.	H&C Tool Supply Corporation	Cutting tools	27	2
94.	5Linx	Telecommunications	200	6
95.	Badger Technologies	Printed circuit board manufacturing	116	1
96.	Bond Financial Network	Employee benefits consulting	26	4
97.	Relph Benefit Advisors	Employee benefits consulting	104	3
98.	Cutting Edge Laser Technologies	Surgical lasers	33	3
99.	Bergmann Associates	Civil engineering	357	17
100.	Ravi Engineering & Land Surveying	Civil engineering	60	1
101.	Enterprise Solutions Consulting, LLC (ESC-Partners)	Management and Technology Consulting	20	10
