= Area sampling frame =

Geographic sampling

An area sampling frame is an alternative to the most traditional type of sampling frames.

A sampling frame is often defined as a list of elements of the population we want to explore through a sample survey. A slightly more general concept considers that a sampling frame is a tool that allows the identification and access to the elements of the population, even if an explicit list does not exist. Traditional sampling frames are sometimes referred to as list frames.

In many cases, suitable lists are not available. This can happen for several reasons, for example:

- Existing lists, such as population censuses, are too old and do not correspond anymore to the current reality.
- We are targeting a population whose list is not feasible, for example a wild animal species.
- The population is a continuous feature in a given geographic area and the definition of its elements is not straightforward. This often happens for sample surveys designed to produce environmental statistics.

Area sampling frames are generally defined by two elements:

- The boundaries of a target region in a given cartographic projection.
- The type of geographic units to be sampled. We can mention three main types of units:
  - Points. In principle, points are dimensionless, but, for practical reasons, we can attribute them a certain size, such as 1 m × 1 m. The suitable size is linked to the accuracy of the tool used for the location of the point. Possible tools are GPS devices, orthophotos or satellite images. Point sampling can be based on a two-stage scheme, sampling clusters in the first stage and sampling points in the second stage. Another option is a two-phase scheme of unclustered points: a large first-phase sample is selected. A stratification is conducted only for the first-phase sample and a stratified sample is chosen in the second phase.
  - Transects. A transect is a piece of straight line of a given length. Transect sampling is useful to estimate the total length of linear landscape elements
  - Areal units defined by polygons. In the jargon of agricultural surveys, areal units are generally called "segments", even if a segment in geometry rather corresponds to the concept of transect used in area sampling frames. Segments can be delineated by photo-interpretation or generated automatically, usually on the basis of a regular grid. The optimal size of segments depends on the spatial auto-correlation of the monitored processes and the cost function that links the price of data collection with the size of the sample unit

== Fields of application ==
The oldest field of application area sampling frames has been probably forest inventories, one of the fields with the most obvious geographic component in which the traditional list frame approach cannot be applied. For the same reason, area frames appear as a natural tool for many environmental topics, such as soil surveys and other topics that require spatial statistics tools.

Different area frame approaches have been widely discussed and compared for agricultural statistics. In the 1930s, the National Agricultural Statistics Service of the US Department of Agriculture introduced area sampling frames for the estimation of crop area and yield on the basis of a sample of areal units (segments). The French Teruti survey chose in the 1960s an approach based on a systematic sample of clusters of points. The Italian AGRIT survey has explored different approaches, comparing segment and point methods. The Joint Research Centre of the EC has conducted a large number of studies on area sampling frame methodology and area frame surveys for agricultural, forestry, environmental and human settlement studies.

The soaring number of applications of satellite images has boosted the interest on area sampling frames, not only because of the use of remote sensing for statistics and because the integration of satellite images has improved the quality of sampling frames and related estimators, but also because satellite images may need to be sampled. Validation of thematic maps produced by satellite image analysis has become one of the main application fields of area sampling frames.
