= CloseCall America =

Defunct Competitive Local Exchange Carrier

CloseCall America, also called CloseCall, was a telephone, Wireless and Internet service provider formed in 1999, with operations headquartered in Stevensville, Maryland. It provided service throughout the United States.

Founded in May 1999, CloseCall was a Competitive Local Exchange Carrier (CLEC) operating in 48 states of the US. CloseCall provided voice and data services to businesses, residential, and government customers on a combination of resold networks from the incumbent carriers. Thomas Mazerski, Mary Guerra Scarborough and Stephen Ruppert were the founders of CloseCall America, but they were acquired by MobilePro in 2004. MobilePro sold its CLEC operations to USA Telephone in 2007.

== See also ==
- List of United States telephone companies
