= Pictometry International =

American aerial measurement company

- Type: Subsidiary
- Industry: Commercial services
- Founded: 2000; 26 years ago
- Founder: Stephen L. Schultz
- Headquarters: Henrietta, New York, U.S.
- Area served: Worldwide
- Key people: Rishi Daga (CEO)
- Products: Geo-referenced aerial image libraries; imaging software; oblique; orthophotography; LiDAR remote sensing; 3D model; street view; inside imagery
- Services: Imagery; analytics; deployment
- Number of employees: 300
- Parent: EagleView Technology Corp
- Website: pictometry.com

Pictometry International is an aerial measurement company based in Henrietta, New York that develops software that uses three-dimensional aerial photographs to view high-resolution images of buildings in their entirety. Pictometry International's technology was developed at the Rochester Institute of Technology and shows structures at an oblique angle or at a 45-degree angle, from all sides providing perspective and overhead shot images that are accurate to 1/100 of an inch. The company has 80 Cessnas that provide high-resolution aerial photography in counties that include 95 percent of the U.S. population.

The company was ranked fifth on the Rochester Top 100 companies list in 2011. Pictometry International along with BLOM ASA and Fugro EarthData, Inc. accounted for approximately a quarter of the global aerial imaging market revenue in 2013.

In 2013, Pictometry International merged with EagleView Technologies, an aerial roof and wall measurement company making EagleView Technology Corp the parent company.

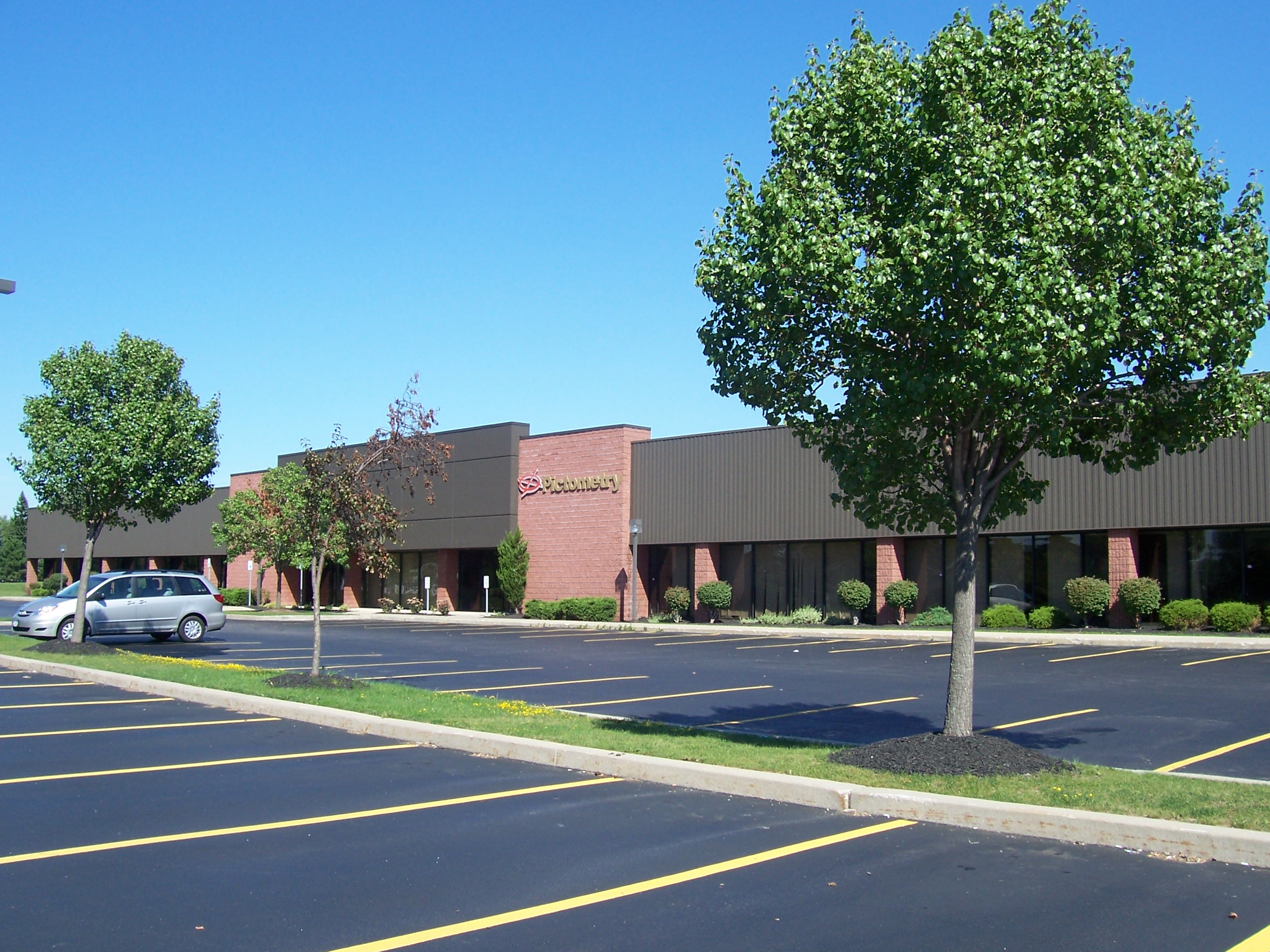
Former Headquarters in Henrietta, New York

== History ==
Pictometry International co-launched in 1996 by John Ciampa, a former Rochester Institute of Technology professor in the school of photography, who after obtaining a patent, hired Stephen Schultz, a Rochester Institute of Technology graduate who developed most of the technology used as a foundation for the company. Schultz created new algorithms for the aerial photography software and also implemented a variety of techniques to capture and analyze the content of aerial photographs also known as photogrammetry.

Pictometry International was founded in 2000. In 2005, Pictometry established an international division which licenses its technology to partners in Europe, Middle East, Africa, Asia, Australia, North and South America.

In 2013, Pictometry merged with Eagle View Technologies, Inc., making both companies subsidiaries of EagleView Technology Corp. The merger led to the offering of comprehensive capabilities in aerial imagery collections, geospatial analytics and 3-D measurement technologies. Chris Barrow is the president and CEO of the combined companies with offices in Bothell, Washington and Henrietta, New York.

== Overview ==
Pictometry International uses an electronic field study application to obtain oblique imagery. Its cloud-based platform called PictometryOnline provides access to current and historic oblique imagery and orthophotography.

Pictometry's aerial photographs have been used by emergency response teams around the country. The company's customer base includes state and local governments, which use images of cities, counties, and entire states for planning and development, emergency response, and property assessment. It is also used in the insurance, real estate, roofing, solar, engineering, and utilities industries.

Pictometry's aerial photograph of Manhattan was used in the National Geographic article "A Superstorm in 2100."

In 2005, Microsoft licensed Pictometry software for birds-eye images to be incorporated with road and satellite maps in their Virtual Earth service.

Pictometry International aided in security efforts for the PGA Championship at the Oak Hill Country Club by providing aerial images of the golf course in 2013.

In 2014, Pictometry's ChangeFinder software was used in Southampton to evaluate property assessment, which included property additions such as second-floor additions, new garages, and floor plan extensions that were not accounted for in the tax assessment. After the evaluating the photos it was estimated that the unaccounted changes were valued at $41 million in assessed value to the tax rolls.
