= EagleView Technologies =

American technology provider

Eagle View Technologies
- Type: Private
- Industry: Technology, Aerial Imagery and Data, Geospatial Intelligence
- Founded: 2008; 18 years ago
- Founders: Dave Carlson; Chris Pershing
- Headquarters: Rochester, New York, U.S.
- Products: Eagleview Reveal Ortho and Oblique Aerial Imagery; 1-inch GSD Aerial Imagery; Eagleview One; Property Data and Property Data APIs; Eagleview AI; Eagleview Assess Drones; Eagleview Disaster Response Program (DRP)
- Owner: Clearlake Capital; Vista Equity Partners
- Website: eagleview.com

Eagleview is a technology provider of 1" (2.54 cm) GSD ortho and oblique aerial imagery, property data and measurements, and geospatial intelligence based in Rochester, New York. The company was founded by Chris Pershing and Dave Carlson in 2008. EagleView merged with aerial imagery provider Pictometry International in 2013, was acquired by Vista Equity Partners in June 2015 and received additional funding from Clearlake Capital in 2018.

== Software and offerings ==
In 2008, EagleView introduced an aerial roof measurement technology using algorithms to infer the size and area of the roof.

In 2011, EagleView introduced EagleView SunSite, a solar 3D-roofing report for solar integrators and installers that estimates solar exposure, rafter lengths, grid layout and overall roof orientation in degrees.

In 2012, EagleView added wall measurement reports that assess damage to siding, walls and windows to its products.

In 2014, EagleView introduced the QuickSquares report and QuickSquares app, which allow the creation of a customized estimate report including an aerial photo of the proposed property to give to the owner before a sale is made.

In 2022, EagleView introduced EagleView Assess, which was able to capture a roof's measurements and conditions through the deployment of autonomous drones.

In 2023, Eagleview announced its Developer Portal which provides documentation and APIs for anyone looking for tools to access Eagleview's APIs for imagery, insights, and 3D models. Developers can plug into Eagleview's 3.5 billion imagery catalog of oblique and ortho aerial imagery captured over 25 years. Property data APIs are also available including measurements, materials, condition, age, and risk scores.

In 2025, Eagleview launched Eagleview One which transformed how industries access geospatial intelligence. The platform enables companies of all sizes and industry to build with Eagleview's high resolution imagery, up to 1" GSD, and gather insights such as measurements, structure identification and quality, as well as view 3D models of properties.
