= Atlanta Business Chronicle =

Weekly newspaper

- Type: Weekly newspaper
- Founder(s): Bob Gray and Mike Weingart
- Publisher: American City Business Journals
- Editor: Dean Anason
- Founded: 1978
- Language: English
- Headquarters: Atlanta, Georgia
- Circulation: 22,740 (as of 2022)
- Website: bizjournals.com/atlanta

The Atlanta Business Chronicle is a weekly newspaper covering business news in Atlanta, Georgia, published by American City Business Journals. The paper has both a weekly print edition and an online edition.

== History ==
The Atlanta Business Chronicle was founded in 1978 by Bob Gray and Mike Weingart. Gray, the publisher, and Weingart, the newspaper's first editor, had previously founded the Houston Business Journal.

In 1980, the company Scripps Howard (now E. W. Scripps Company) bought the Cordovan Corporation, which owned the Atlanta Business Chronicle and other business newspapers. From 1980 to 1983, Carol Carter served as the paper's editor. In 1986, the paper was sold to American City Business Journals.

In 1988, the Atlanta Business Chronicle was the first to break the major story that the Sumitomo Life Insurance Company was buying the IBM Tower (One Atlantic Center) for $300 million. At the time, the editor of the paper was Anita Sharpe. Under Sharpe, two Gerald Loeb Awards were won by the paper for investigative reporting.

In the 1990s, the Atlanta Business Chronicle was also first to report many major stories, such as the ventures of the ISP MindSpring (now EarthLink) and communications company Scientific Atlanta. Other first stories included the introduction of the 770 telephone area code to Atlanta. In 2007, the paper had a staff of 66.

Annually, the Atlanta Business Chronicle gives out awards for "40 under 40," which is 40 people under the age of 40 who are professionals that have demonstrated leadership and social responsibility in Atlanta.

The Atlanta Business Chronicle has a paid circulation of 23,275, along with 729,899 monthly online readers.
