= GIS and public health =

Implementation of Geographic Information System

Geographic information systems (GISs) and geographic information science (GIScience) combine computer-mapping capabilities with additional database management and data analysis tools. Commercial GIS systems are powerful and have many applications and industrial use cases, including in environmental science, urban planning, agricultural applications, and others.

Public health is another focus area that has made increasing use of GIS techniques. A strict definition of public health is difficult to pin down, as it is used in different ways by different groups. In general, public health differs from personal health in that it is (1) focused on the health of populations rather than of individuals, (2) focused more on prevention than on treatment, and (3) operates in a mainly governmental (rather than private) context. These efforts fall naturally within the domain of problems requiring use of spatial analysis as part of the solution, and GIS and other spatial analysis tools are therefore recognized as providing potentially transformational capabilities for public health efforts.

This article presents some history of use of geographic information and geographic information systems in public health application areas, provides some examples showing the utilization of GIS techniques in solving specific public health problems, and finally addresses several potential issues arising from increased use of these GIS techniques in the public health arena.

== History ==
Dr. Snow's map showing cholera cases in London during the epidemic of 1854

Public health efforts have been based on analysis and use of spatial data for many years. Dr. John Snow (physician), often credited as the father of epidemiology, is arguably the most famous of those examples. Dr. Snow used a hand-drawn map to analyze the geographic locations of deaths related to cholera in London in the mid-1850s. His map, which superimposed the locations of cholera deaths with those of public water supplies, pinpointed the Broad Street pump as the most likely source of the cholera outbreak. Removal of the pump handle led to a rapid decline in the incidence of cholera, helping the medical community to eventually conclude that cholera was a water-borne disease.

Dr. Snow's work provides an indication of how a GIS could benefit public health investigations and other research. He continued to analyze his data, eventually showing that the incidence rate of cholera was also related to local elevation as well as soil type and alkalinity. Low-lying areas, particularly those with poorly draining soil, were found to have higher incidence rates for cholera, which Dr. Snow attributed to the pools of water that tended to collect there, again showing evidence that cholera was in fact a water-borne disease (rather than one borne by 'miasma' as was commonly believed at the time.

This is an early example of what has come to be known as disease diffusion mapping, an area of study based on the idea that a disease starts from some source or central point and then spreads throughout the local area according to patterns and conditions there. This is another area of research where the capabilities of a GIS have been shown to be of help to practitioners.

== GIS for public health ==
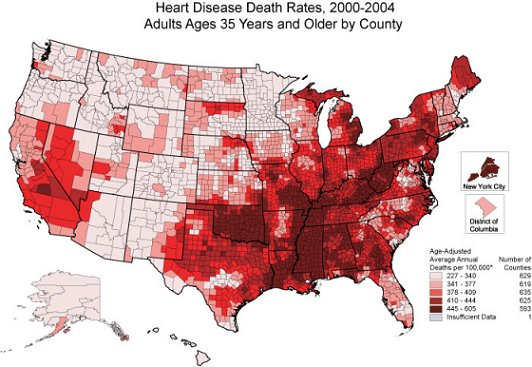
More modern disease map showing deaths from heart disease among white males in the US from 2000–2004

Today's public health problems are much larger in scope than those Dr. Snow faced, and researchers today depend on modern GIS and other computer mapping applications to assist in their analyses. For example, see the map to the right depicting death rates from heart disease among white males above age 35 in the US between 2000 and 2004.

Public health informatics (PHI) is an emerging specialty which focuses on the application of information science and technology to public health practice and research. As part of that effort, a GIS – or more generally a spatial decision support system (SDSS) – offers improved geographic visualization techniques, leading to faster, better, and more robust understanding and decision-making capabilities in the public health arena.

For example, GIS displays have been used to show engagement with online health information during infectious disease pandemics, as well as associations between clusters of emergent Hepatitis C cases and those of known intravenous drug users in Connecticut. Causality is difficult to prove conclusively – collocation does not establish causation – but confirmation of previously established causal relationships (like intravenous drug use and Hepatitis C) can strengthen acceptance of those relationships, as well as help to demonstrate the utility and reliability of GIS-related solution techniques. Conversely, showing the coincidence of potential causal factors with the ultimate effect can help suggest a potential causal relationship, thereby driving further investigation and analysis.

Alternately, GIS techniques have been used to show a lack of correlation between causes and effects or between different effects. For example, the distributions of both birth defects and infant mortality in Iowa were studied, and the researchers found no relationship in those data. This led to the conclusion that birth defects and infant mortality are likely unrelated, and are likely due to different causes and risk factors.

GIS can support public health in different ways as well. First and foremost, GIS displays can help inform proper understanding and drive better decisions. For example, elimination of health disparities is one of two primary goals of Healthy People 2010, one of the preeminent public health programs in existence today in the US. GIS can play a significant role in that effort, helping public health practitioners identify areas of disparities or inequities, and ideally helping them identify and develop solutions to address those shortcomings. GIS can also help researchers integrate disparate data from a wide variety of sources, and can even be used to enforce quality control measures on those data. Much public health data is still manually generated, and is therefore subject to human-generated mistakes and miscoding. For example, geographic analysis of health care data from North Carolina showed that just over 40% of the records contained errors of some sort in the geographic information (city, county, or zip code), errors that would have gone undetected without the visual displays provided by GIS. Correction of these errors led not only to more correct GIS displays, but also improved ALL analyses using those data.

== Issues with GIS for public health ==
There are also concerns or issues with use of GIS tools for public health efforts. Chief among those is a concern for privacy and confidentiality of individuals. Public health is concerned about the health of the population as a whole, but must use data on the health of individuals to make many of those assessments, and protecting the privacy and confidentiality of those individuals is of paramount importance. Use of GIS displays and related databases raises the potential of compromising those privacy standards, so some precautions are necessary to avoid pinpointing individuals based on spatial data. For example, data may need to be aggregated to cover larger areas such as a census tract or county, helping to mask individual identities. Maps can also be constructed at smaller scales so that less detail is revealed. Alternately, key identifying features (such as the road and street network) can be left off the maps to mask exact location, or it may even be advisable to intentionally offset the location markers by some random amount if deemed necessary.

It is well established in the literature that statistical inference based on aggregated data can lead researchers to erroneous conclusions, suggesting relationships that in fact do not exist or obscuring relationships that do in fact exist. This issue is known as the modifiable areal unit problem. For example, New York public health officials worried that cancer clusters and causes would be misidentified after they were forced to post maps showing cancer cases by ZIP code on the internet. Their assertion was that ZIP codes were designed for a purpose unrelated to public health issues, and so use of these arbitrary boundaries might lead to inappropriate groupings and then to incorrect conclusions. Further, when comparing data in different aerial units, the difference in size and population means that comparing totals can hide underlying trends in the data. This issue is particularly prevalent with choropleth maps. To solve this, cartographers often apply some form of normalization, such as cases per 100,000 people. Unfortunately, this practice is not always adhered to and can cause potentially misleading maps.

== See also ==
- Arbia's law of geography
- boundary problem
- Biogeography
- Cartography
- Concepts and Techniques in Modern Geography
- distance decay
- ecological fallacy
- geography
- Geospatial predictive modeling
- geographic information systems
- geographic information science
- modifiable areal unit problem
- Public health
- spatial analysis
- spatial autocorrelation
- Spatial epidemiology
- Time geography
- Tobler's first law of geography
- Tobler's second law of geography
- Transportation geography
- Uncertain geographic context problem
- Urban geography
- Waldo Tobler
