= Neighborhood effect averaging problem =

Source of statistical bias

The neighborhood effect averaging problem (NEAP) is a source of statistical bias that can significantly impact the results of statistical hypothesis tests. It is caused by the influence of aggregating neighborhood-level phenomena on individuals when mobility-dependent exposures influence the phenomena. The problem confounds the neighbourhood effect, which suggests that a person's neighborhood impacts their individual characteristics, such as health. It relates to the boundary problem, in that delineated neighborhoods used for analysis may not fully account for an individual's activity space if the borders are permeable, and individual mobility crosses the boundaries. The term was first coined by Mei-Po Kwan in 2018.

== Background ==
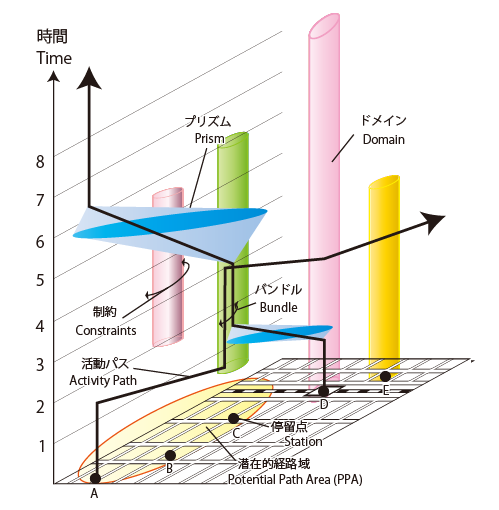
Examples of the visual language of time geography: space-time cube, path, prism, bundle, and other concepts

Mei-Po Kwan highlighted the importance of accounting for spatial processes and interactions within neighborhoods in a 2018 paper. She argued that the analysis's neighborhood effect averaging problem arises from disregarding spatial dependence and spatial heterogeneity, and is credited with its discovery. In studying human geography, understanding the relationship between individual-level attributes and the effects of the neighborhood in which individuals reside is crucial. However, a NEAP arises due to the mismatch between the scale at which data is collected (individual level) and the scale at which analysis is conducted (neighborhood level). Individual-level data often provide detailed information about individuals, including socioeconomic status, education level, or health conditions, while neighborhood-level data offers a broader perspective on specific areas, encompassing factors like average income, crime rates, or access to amenities. The neighborhood effect averaging problem emerges as researchers attempt to integrate the disparate data scales of individuals and neighborhoods. The common approach involves aggregating individual-level data to the neighborhood level by calculating summary statistics such as means or proportions for each neighborhood. However, this oversimplifies the analysis by assuming that individuals within the neighborhood all have activity spaces and space-time paths within the neighborhood's borders. Studies applying the neighborhood effect fail to capture the individual's real neighborhood by failing to consider mobility. A person's mobility may amplify or attenuate environmental factors in their neighborhood.

== Addressing the neighborhood effect averaging problem ==
To address this problem, Kwan proposed utilizing spatial statistical techniques to consider individuals neighborhood contexts at different temporal scales throughout their life. By incorporating these methods, researchers can model and analyze the spatial relationships between individuals and their neighborhoods. Factors such as proximity, spatial autocorrelation, and the influence of neighboring areas can be considered, providing a more accurate understanding of the complex dynamics between individuals and their environment.

== Implications and significance ==
=== Spatial analysis ===
By acknowledging and tackling the neighborhood effect averaging problem, researchers can better understand how individual characteristics interact with neighborhood contexts to shape various outcomes, such as health outcomes, educational attainment, or social behavior. This approach advances urban and regional studies knowledge, providing insights into the intricate interplay between individuals and their surrounding environment. Failure to account for the neighborhood effect averaging problem may lead to erroneous findings.

=== Policy ===
The neighborhood effect averaging problem suggests that simply improving neighborhood conditions may not improve an individual's experience. By increasing cross-neighborhood transit and interactions between disadvantaged and advantaged neighborhoods, it may be possible to improve individual outcomes like health.

== See also ==
- Arbia's law of geography – One of several proposed laws of geography
- Modifiable areal unit problem – Source of statistical bias
- Modifiable temporal unit problem – Source of statistical bias
- Permeability (spatial and transport planning) – Freedom of movement of traffic
- Spatial Analysis – Techniques to study geometric data
- Tobler's first law of geography – 1969 law by Waldo Tobler
- Tobler's second law of geography – One of several proposed laws of geography
- Uncertain geographic context problem – Source of statistical bias
