= Scale effect =

Scale effect may refer to:

- Economies of scale
- In geography, scale effect or scale dependency means different scales or resolutions may result in different observations and different conclusions. See Scale (geography)
