= Boundary problem (spatial analysis) =

Geographical problem of calculating properties near edges of areas

A boundary problem in analysis is a phenomenon in which geographical patterns are differentiated by the shape and arrangement of boundaries that are drawn for administrative or measurement purposes. The boundary problem occurs because of the loss of neighbors in analyses that depend on the values of the neighbors. While geographic phenomena are measured and analyzed within a specific unit, identical spatial data can appear either dispersed or clustered depending on the boundary placed around the data. In analysis with point data, dispersion is evaluated as dependent of the boundary. In analysis with areal data, statistics should be interpreted based upon the boundary.

== Definition ==
In spatial analysis, four major problems interfere with an accurate estimation of the statistical parameter: the boundary problem, scale problem, pattern problem (or spatial autocorrelation), and modifiable areal unit problem. The boundary problem occurs because of the loss of neighbours in analyses that depend on the values of the neighbours. While geographic phenomena are measured and analyzed within a specific unit, identical spatial data can appear either dispersed or clustered depending on the boundary placed around the data. In analysis with point data, dispersion is evaluated as dependent of the boundary. In analysis with area data, statistics should be interpreted based upon the boundary.

In geographical research, two types of areas are taken into consideration in relation to the boundary: an area surrounded by fixed natural boundaries (e.g., coastlines or streams), outside of which neighbours do not exist, or an area included in a larger region defined by arbitrary artificial boundaries (e.g., an air pollution boundary in modeling studies or an urban boundary in population migration). In an area isolated by the natural boundaries, the spatial process discontinues at the boundaries. In contrast, if a study area is delineated by the artificial boundaries, the process continues beyond the area.

If a spatial process in an area occurs beyond a study area or has an interaction with neighbours outside artificial boundaries, the most common approach is to neglect the influence of the boundaries and assume that the process occurs at the internal area. However, such an approach leads to a significant model misspecification problem.

That is, for measurement or administrative purposes, geographic boundaries are drawn, but the boundaries per se can bring about different spatial patterns in geographic phenomena. It has been reported that the difference in the way of drawing the boundary significantly affects identification of the spatial distribution and estimation of the statistical parameters of the spatial process. The difference is largely based on the fact that spatial processes are generally unbounded or fuzzy-bounded, but the processes are expressed in data imposed within boundaries for analysis purposes. Although the boundary problem was discussed in relation to artificial and arbitrary boundaries, the effect of the boundaries also occurs according to natural boundaries as long as it is ignored that properties at sites on the natural boundary such as streams are likely to differ from those at sites within the boundary.

The boundary problem occurs with regard not only to horizontal boundaries but also to vertically drawn boundaries according to delineations of heights or depths (Pineda 1993). For example, biodiversity such as the density of species of plants and animals is high near the surface, so if the identically divided height or depth is used as a spatial unit, it is more likely to find fewer of the plant and animal species as the height or depth increases.

== Types and examples ==
By drawing a boundary around a study area, two types of problems in measurement and analysis takes place. The first is an edge effect. This effect originates from the ignorance of interdependences that occur outside the bounded region. Griffith and Griffith and Amrhein highlighted problems according to the edge effect. A typical example is a cross-boundary influence such as cross-border jobs, services and other resources located in a neighbouring municipality.

The second is a shape effect that results from the artificial shape delineated by the boundary. As an illustration of the effect of the artificial shape, point pattern analysis tends to provide higher levels of clustering for the identical point pattern within a unit that is more elongated. Similarly, the shape can influence interaction and flow among spatial entities. For example, the shape can affect the measurement of origin-destination flows since these are often recorded when they cross an artificial boundary. Because of the effect set by the boundary, the shape and area information is used to estimate travel distances from surveys, or to locate traffic counters, travel survey stations, or traffic monitoring systems. From the same perspective, Theobald (2001; retrieved from) argued that measures of urban sprawl should consider interdependences and interactions with nearby rural areas.

In spatial analysis, the boundary problem has been discussed along with the modifiable areal unit problem (MAUP) inasmuch as MAUP is associated with the arbitrary geographic unit and the unit is defined by the boundary. For administrative purposes, data for policy indicators are usually aggregated within larger units (or enumeration units) such as census tracts, school districts, municipalities and counties. The artificial units serve the purposes of taxation and service provision. For example, municipalities can effectively respond to the need of the public in their jurisdictions. However, in such spatially aggregated units, spatial variations of detailed social variables cannot be identified. The problem is noted when the average degree of a variable and its unequal distribution over space are measured.

== Suggested solutions and evaluations on the solutions ==
Several strategies for resolving geographic boundary problems in measurement and analysis have been proposed. To identify the effectiveness of the strategies, Griffith reviewed traditional techniques that were developed to mitigate the edge effects: ignoring the effects, undertaking a torus mapping, construction of an empirical buffer zone, construction of an artificial buffer zone, extrapolation into a buffer zone, utilizing a correction factor, etc. The first method (i.e., the ignorance of the edge effects), assumes an infinite surface in which the edge effects do not occur. In fact, this approach has been used by traditional geographical theories (e.g., central place theory). Its main shortcoming is that empirical phenomena occur within a finite area, so an infinite and homogeneous surface is unrealistic. The remaining five approaches are similar in that they attempted to produce unbiased parameter estimation, that is, to provide a medium by which the edge effects are removed. (He called these operational solutions as opposed to statistical solutions to be discussed below.) Specifically, the techniques aim at a collection of data beyond the boundary of the study area and fit a larger model, that is, mapping over the area or over-bounding the study area. Through simulation analysis, however, Griffith and Amrhein identified the inadequacy of such an overbounding technique. Moreover, this technique can bring about issues related to large-area statistics, that is, ecological fallacy. By expanding the boundary of the study area, micro-scale variations within the boundary can be ignored.

As alternatives to operational solutions, Griffith examined three correction techniques (i.e., statistical solutions) in removing boundary-induced bias from inference. They are (1) based on generalized least squares theory, (2) using dummy variables and a regression structure (as a way of creating a buffer zone), and (3) regarding the boundary problem as a missing values problem. However, these techniques require rather strict assumptions about the process of interest. For example, the solution according to the generalized least squares theory utilizes time-series modeling that needs an arbitrary transformation matrix to fit the multidirectional dependencies and multiple boundary units found in geographical data. Martin also argued that some of the underlying assumptions of the statistical techniques are unrealistic or unreasonably strict. Moreover, Griffith (1985) himself also identified the inferiority of the techniques through simulation analysis.

As particularly applicable using GIS technologies, a possible solution for addressing both edge and shape effects is to an re-estimation of the spatial or process under repeated random realizations of the boundary. This solution provides an experimental distribution that can be subjected to statistical tests. This strategy examines the sensitivity in the estimation result according to changes in the boundary assumptions. With GIS tools, boundaries can be systematically manipulated. The tools then conduct the measurement and analysis of the spatial process in such differentiated boundaries. Such a sensitivity analysis allows the evaluation of the reliability and robustness of place-based measures that are defined within artificial boundaries. In the meantime, the changes in the boundary assumptions refer not only to altering or tilting the angles of the boundary, but also differentiating between the boundary and interior areas in examination and considering a possibility that isolated data collection points close to the boundary may show large variances.

== See also ==
- Arbia's law of geography
- Concepts and Techniques in Modern Geography
- distance decay
- ecological fallacy
- Fuzzy architectural spatial analysis
- Geographic information system
- Level of analysis
- Modifiable temporal unit problem
- Tobler's first law of geography
- Tobler's second law of geography
- Uncertain geographic context problem
