= MTUP =

MTUP may refer to:

- the modifiable temporal unit problem, a source of statistical bias
- the Mongolian Traditional United Party, a political party in Mongolia
- the MTU Probe option in Internet Protocol version 4
