= Suitability analysis =

Suitability analysis is the process and procedures used to establish the suitability of a system – that is, the ability of a system to meet the needs of a stakeholder or other user.

Before GIS (a computerized method that helps to determine suitability analysis) was widely used in the mid to late 20th century, city planners communicated their suitability analysis ideas by laying transparencies in increasing darkness over maps of the present conditions. This technique's descendant is used in a GIS application called multicriteria decision analysis. In the 1960s, a mechanism called the ecological inventory process was developed to document existing surrounding land conditions to help inform the analysis for the land in question. These mechanisms were computerized upon the advent of computers due to inefficiencies in the methods, such as the inability to overlay a large number of transparencies.

In order to feed a growing population that is pushing on the ability to extensively farm, suitability analysis is becoming more necessary to utilize the most productive land to its fullest potential, matching the needs of the plants more carefully to the existing assets in the environment. This technique is known as precision farming.

Suitability analysis can also be used to track and label potential hazards, like earthquakes, contamination, or even crime. It can also be used to locate advantageous locations for commercial centers.

== Suitability model ==
A suitability model is a model that weights locations relative to each other based on given criteria. Suitability models might aid in finding a favorable location for a new facility, road, or habitat for a species of bird. Overlay analysis is a common method for creating a suitability model which involves using GIS techniques and software. Overlay techniques were originally advanced by Ian McHarg, who used a manual overlay cartographic process which he describes in his 1969 book Design with Nature. With the advancement of computer mapping software, suitability modeling has become much easier and faster to implement, and today it is used for many varying tasks.

=== Overview ===
There are seven general steps required to create an acceptable suitability model:

1. Define the problem
2. Break the problem into submodels
3. Determine significant layers
4. Reclassify or transform the data within a layer
5. Weight the input layers
6. Add or combine the layers
7. Analyze

==== Define the problem ====
Without a clear understanding of the problem that needs to be solved a suitability model cannot be successful. All other steps in the process will contribute to the objective of solving this problem. The components of this objective should also be defined, as well as a way of knowing when the problem has been solved. Considering the issue of deforestation, to lower deforestation rates a suitability model could be created to model areas most likely to be deforested in the immediate future; laws and regulating entities could then be focused on those areas most susceptible to deforestation. The overall goal of the deforestation suitability model would be to slow the rate of deforestation.

==== Break the problem into submodels ====
The complexity of most suitability modeling problems can be overwhelming and confusing; for this reason, it is advisable to break the model into submodels. For deforestation there are many different drivers, therefore, a variety of submodels would be needed. Population, population density, movement of people, elevation, slope, land cover type, hydrology, location of protected areas, soil type, laws, roads and infrastructure, the list could go on, all of these things affect where deforestation happens and the intensity. Combining these factors could lead to a submodel for physical environment (elevation, slope, land cover, land use, soil type, and hydrology), for built environment (roads, infrastructure, and other relevant transportation networks), and for demographic characteristics (population, population density, population growth rate, and poverty rate).

==== Determine significant layers ====
Each submodel should be defining an aspect of the overall model, and only submodel factors which contribute to solving the original problem should be included in a submodel. It is in this step that data must be gathered, and layers created; for example, it may be known that deforestation usually happens a certain distance from city/road/agricultural areas, therefore a Euclidean distance tool (within a GIS software package) could be used to create a distance raster around these areas.

==== Reclassification/transformation ====
There are many different datasets going into the model, all with varying number systems; this means that attempting to combine these datasets would give meaningless results. Therefore, a common number scale should be chosen (usually 1 to 9 for a weighted overlay and 0 to 1 for a fuzzy overlay; with larger values signifying more favorable areas) and each dataset reclassified to the new scale (there should be a tool for this in most GIS applications).

==== Weight ====
If there is strong evidence that some factors contribute more to the main goal these factors should be weighted based on their level of contribution. For instance, focusing specifically on deforestation in Africa, previous research shows that one of the main causes of deforestation is fuel wood extraction; therefore, variables associated with fuel wood extraction should be weighted more heavily than other variables. Weighting should not be done if a fuzzy overlay is used.

==== Add/combine ====
To complete the model, all factors must be combined, usually through a weighted overlay or fuzzy overlay technique. For a weighted overlay all the factors would be added together and reclassified to form a new data layer where high values signify more favorable locations and low values less favorable locations. A fuzzy overlay analysis produces the same type of results but through more complex methods.

==== Analyze ====
Once the suitability model is complete the results should be analyzed. It is always a good idea to examine the results closely to verify that they make sense, and no mistakes were made. Before the model is used the results should also be verified and validated. Ideally, the value of predictive methods based in habitat suitability to estimate for instance the population size of common species should be tested before conducting large-scale monitoring, rather than a posteriori. Although logistically challenging, this can be achieved by designing monitoring programs including an intensive sampling of abundance in ad hoc reference areas of variable size. After the analysis is complete locations can be selected using the model and this information can be applied to the original problem.

== Suitability in GIS context ==
Suitability analysis in a GIS context is a geographic, or GIS-based process used to determine the appropriateness of a given area for a particular use. The basic premise of GIS suitability analysis is that each aspect of the landscape has intrinsic characteristics that are to some degree either suitable or unsuitable for the activities being planned. Suitability is determined through systematic, multi-factor analysis of the different aspects of the terrain. Model inputs include a variety of physical, cultural, and economic factors. The results are often displayed on a map that is used to highlight areas from high to low suitability.

A GIS suitability model typically answers the question, "Where is the best location?" — whether it involves finding the best location for a new road or pipeline, a new housing development, or a retail store. For instance, a commercial developer building a new retail store may take into consideration distance to major highways and any competitors' stores, then combine the results with land use, population density, and consumer spending data to decide on the best location for that store.

=== GIS applications ===
- Land use analysis: Land-use suitability analysis requires the use of GIS (Geographic Information Systems) in order to survey geographical suitability. This process can be viewed through the techno-positivist and the socio-political, public engagement perspectives. Within the analysis of suitability there are also needed factors regarding economic opportunity costs and social implications within particular areas of land. There has been critique in the role that both of these aspects of careful spatial planning entail. The instrumental approach to spatial analysis can either be seen as a tool, or as a main plan when it comes to suitability. This brings up the theoretical questions of space, place, and the social construction of both. Land-Use suitability requires a multicriteria analysis, which is allows assumptive and theoretical mapping to become actualized. Most jurisdictions use land suitability analysis for site selection, impact studies, and land use planning.
- Retail site selection: Suitability analysis is critical for both marketing and merchandising purposes, as well as for choosing new retail locations.
- Agriculture
- Defense
- Crime analysis
- Town Planning
- Wildlife: The identification of physical structures, natural habitats, and the relationship between the two and the environmental impacts of that. This allows for the optimization between the relationship of enhancing wildlife while also allowing for man-made development.

== Possibility space ==
The possibility space is a framework that allows for the analysis of all possible consequences and benefits of a suitability analysis. This is created through geometrical data analysis conducted in real time with technological land mapping, allowing for the development of multiple combinations of suitability. Physically it is a visual interactive database that allows for a holistic composition of suitability.

== Methods ==
- Gestalt method: The area is mapped, and similar regions are identified. Additional maps are drawn for each homogeneous location representing each possible land use, which are compared and analyzed to ascertain the best possible land use. However, this method is not very commonly used because it requires intense knowledge of the place in question, usually only acquired when the planner has the opportunity to live in the space and dedicate an ample amount of time to it. It is also more difficult to communicate it effectively.
- Ordinal combination method: The area is mapped according to qualities of the land, including slope, soil type, vegetation, climate, etc., and each quality has a rating associated with it corresponding to its value. Therefore, the land use is determined by the suitability rating given to it based on the comparable qualities of other areas. Some shortfalls include that the rating is subjective to the expert, and each rating must be done on the same scale to be comparable.
- Ordinal priority approach (OPA): A method that calculates the weight of each component and determines the suitability of a system based on preference relations.
- Linear combination method: The rated qualities of the ordinal combination method are compared with different weights with the most weight put on the most important value and the least weight put on the least important, though each rating is put on the same interval scale.
- Values suitability analysis: Human values (like aesthetic preferences, etc.) are taken into account with similar weight to quantifiable costs and benefits in deciding land suitability. This is done frequently in deciding incorporation of open spaces and their management techniques.
- AHP (Analytic Hierarchy Process): A method that determines the weight of each component of the land making it favorable or unfavorable for each use. It has the capability to identify inconsistencies in judgement.

== Results ==
When suitability analyses are done, several different usability options may be found for the same section of land. This can be advantageous or limiting. If the land is found suitable for two or more uses that can be combined, the land uses are found compatible. An example of this may be a building with businesses on the bottom floor with residences on upper floors. Compatible land uses result in a win-win development; a need for more commerce is met while meeting a need for more housing, while also keeping people on the street all day, thereby reducing the probability of crime. Conflicting land use occurs when a piece of land can be used only for one use or the other. This is exemplified by a piece of land that can either be used as agricultural land or developed into a housing tract—should the land be developed; it can no longer be used for agriculture. The suitability analysis comes back into play here by helping planners prioritize which need is greater (in the case of the example, is housing or agricultural land more necessary in light of economic or demand pressure).

== See also ==
- GIS
- Spatial analysis
- Geospatial predictive modeling
- Environmental planning
- Multiple-criteria decision analysis
