= Tobler's second law of geography =

One of several proposed laws of geography

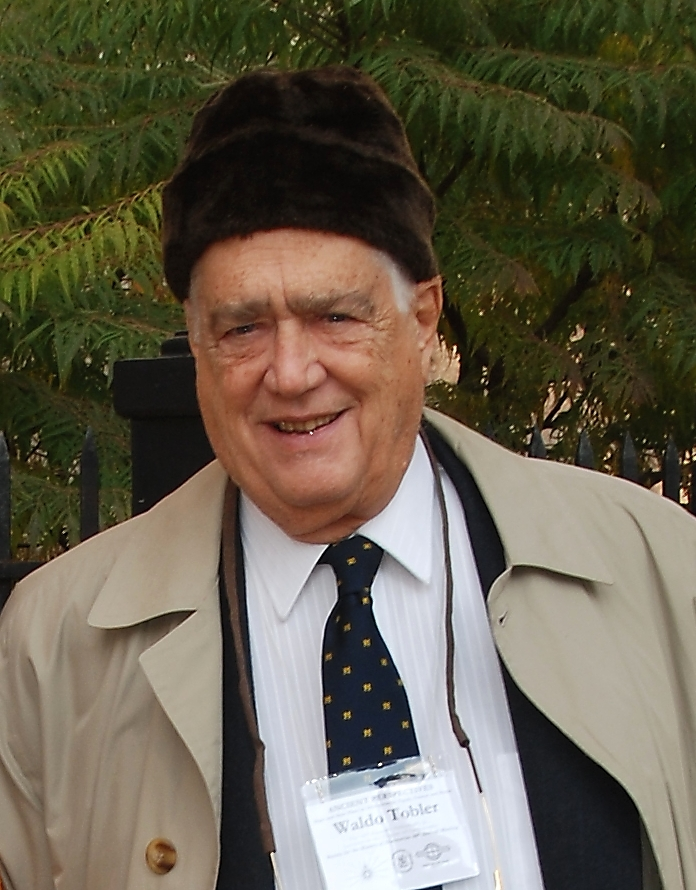
Waldo Tobler in front of the Newberry Library. Chicago, November 2007

The second law of geography, according to Waldo Tobler, is "the phenomenon external to a geographic area of interest affects what goes on inside." This is an extension of his first. He first published it in 1999 in reply to a paper titled "Linear pycnophylactic reallocation comment on a paper by D. Martin" and then again in response to criticism of his first law of geography titled "On the First Law of Geography: A Reply". Much of this criticism was centered on the question of if laws were meaningful in geography or any of the social sciences. In this document, Tobler proposed his second law while recognizing others have proposed other concepts to fill the role of 2nd law. Tobler asserted that this phenomenon is common enough to warrant the title of 2nd law of geography. Unlike Tobler's first law of geography, which is relatively well accepted among geographers, there are a few contenders for the title of the second law of geography. Tobler's second law of geography is less well known but still has profound implications for geography and spatial analysis.

Tobler's second law of geography has implications whenever a boundary is drawn on a map, particularly in arbitrary boundaries such as political borders.

== Foundation ==
In spatial analysis, it is often (usually) necessary to subset a study area from the globe. Tobler's first law of geography states that "everything is related to everything else, but near things are more related than distant." Thus, the geographic area relevant to a phenomenon being studied extends far outside this study area, and this relevant geographic location is not necessarily consistent over time. Due to distance decay, the effect of distant things falls as distance increases but never goes to zero. This has implications in both the modifiable areal unit problem (MAUP), the boundary problem, and the Uncertain geographic context problem (UGCoP). In the boundary problem in particular, when geographic boundaries are arbitrary and not based on natural features, the phenomena under evaluation is likely to continue and be influenced by space beyond the study area.

== Controversy ==
In general, some dispute the entire concept of laws in geography and the social sciences. These criticisms have been addressed by Tobler and others. However, this is an ongoing source of debate in geography and unlikely to be resolved anytime soon.

== Other proposed second laws of geography ==
Some have argued that geographic laws do not need to be numbered. However, the existence of a first invites the creation of a second. In addition to Tobler's second law, several scholars have proposed candidates for a second.

- Arbia's law of geography: "Everything is related to everything else, but things observed at a coarse spatial resolution are more related than things observed at a finer resolution."
- Spatial heterogeneity: This concept has a longer history than the first law of geography and dates back to regional geography that emphasizes heterogeneity as "an inescapable characteristic of geography". Spatial heterogeneity was first proposed as "a possible candidate" of the second law of geography by Michael F. Goodchild, who attributes this law to David Harvey. Chinese geographers often cite it simply as the "second law of geography".
- Tim Foresman and Ruth Luscombe's Second law of geography: "Things that know where they are can act on their locational knowledge. Spatially enabled things have increased financial and functional utility."
- the uncertainty principle: "that the geographic world is infinitely complex and that any representation must therefore contain elements of uncertainty, that many definitions used in acquiring geographic data contain elements of vagueness, and that it is impossible to measure location on the Earth's surface exactly."
- It has been proposed that Tobler's first law of geography should be moved to the second and replaced with another.

== See also ==
- Ecological fallacy
- Indicators of spatial association
- Level of analysis
- Modifiable temporal unit problem
- Moran's I
- Neighborhood effect averaging problem
- Scientific law
- Spatial autocorrelation
- Spatial heterogeneity
- Uncertain geographic context problem
- Quantitative geography
- Waldo Tobler bibliography
