= Modifiable temporal unit problem =

Source of statistical bias

Flowchart illustrating selected units of time. The graphic also shows the three celestial objects that are related to the units of time.

The Modified Temporal Unit Problem (MTUP) is a source of statistical bias that occurs in time series and spatial analysis when using temporal data that has been aggregated into temporal units. In such cases, choosing a temporal unit (e.g., days, months, years) can affect the analysis results and lead to inconsistencies or errors in statistical hypothesis testing.

== Background ==
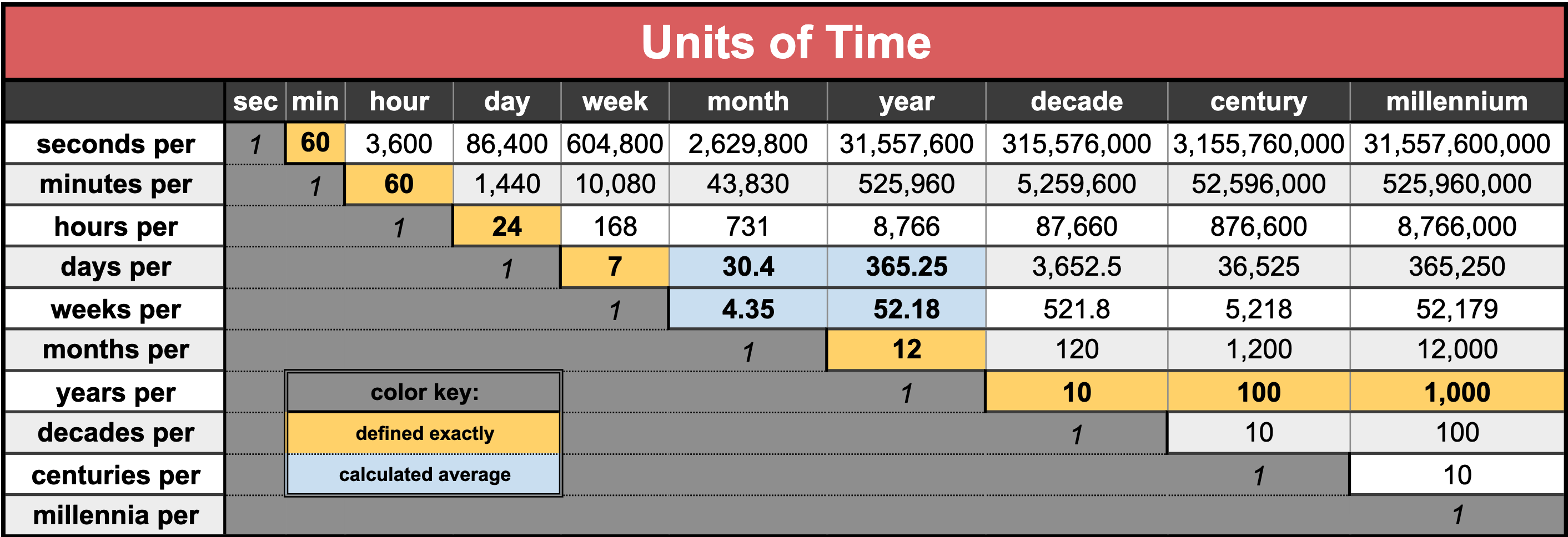
Table showing quantitative relationships between common units of time

The MTUP is closely related to the modifiable areal unit problem or MAUP, in that they both relate to the scale of analysis and the issue of choosing an appropriate analysis. While the MAUP refers to the choice of spatial enumeration units, the MTUP arises because different temporal units have different properties and characteristics, such as the number of periods they contain or the amount of detail they provide. For example, daily sales data for a product can be aggregated into weekly, monthly, or yearly sales data. In this case, using monthly data instead of daily data can result in losing important information about the timing of events, and using yearly data can obscure short-term trends and patterns. However, the daily data in the example may have too much noise, temporal autocorrelation, or be inconsistent with other datasets. With only daily data, conducting an analysis accurately at the hourly rate would not be possible. In addition, the Modifiable Temporal Unit Problem can also arise when the time units are irregular or when the data is missing for some periods. In such cases, the choice of the time unit can affect the amount of missing data, which can impact the accuracy of the analysis and forecasting.

Overall, the Modifiable Temporal Unit Problem highlights the importance of carefully considering the time unit when analyzing and forecasting time series data. It is often necessary to try different time units and evaluate the results to determine the most appropriate choice.

== Temporal autocorrelation ==
Temporal autocorrelation is the degree of correlation or similarity between values of a variable at different time points. It examines how a variable's past values are related to its current values over a sequence of time intervals. High temporal autocorrelation implies that past observations influence future observations, while low autocorrelation suggests that current values are independent of past values. This concept is often used in time series analysis to understand patterns, trends, and dependencies within a time-ordered dataset, helping to make predictions and infer the underlying dynamics of a system over time. By adjusting the temporal unit used to bin the data in the analysis, temporal autocorrelation can be addressed.

== Implications ==
=== Crime ===
The impact of MTUP on crime analysis can be significant, as it can affect the accuracy and reliability of crime data and its conclusions about crime patterns and trends. For example, suppose the temporal unit of analysis is changed from days to weeks. In that case, the number of reported crimes may decrease or increase, even if the underlying pattern remains constant. This can lead to incorrect conclusions about the effectiveness of crime prevention strategies or the overall level of crime in a given area.

=== Food accessibility ===
The MTUP can also have an impact on food accessibility. This issue arises when the temporal unit of analysis is changed, leading to changes in the patterns and trends observed in food accessibility data. For example, if food accessibility data is analyzed from different years or aggregated differently, then the results of a study are likely to be impacted. This can affect our understanding of the availability of food in different areas over time, and can result in incorrect or incomplete conclusions about food accessibility.

=== Epidemiology ===
The MTUP can affect our understanding of the incidence and prevalence of diseases or health outcomes in different populations over time, resulting in incorrect or incomplete conclusions about the public health situation. The timeframe chosen for collecting and analyzing public health data is something that needs to be considered by researchers.

== Suggested solutions ==
To address the MTUP, it is important to consider the temporal resolution of the data and choose the most appropriate temporal unit based on the research question and the goals of the analysis. In some cases, it may be necessary to aggregate or interpolate the data to a consistent temporal unit. Additionally, it may be helpful to use multiple temporal units or to present results for different temporal units to demonstrate the sensitivity of the results to the choice of temporal unit.

== See also ==
- Arbia's law of geography
- Boundary problem (spatial analysis)
- Coastline paradox
- Concepts and Techniques in Modern Geography
- Chronology
- Ecological fallacy
- Facility location problem
- Geographic information systems
- Historical GIS
- Neighborhood effect averaging problem
- Seasonality
- Torsten Hägerstrand
- Spatial epidemiology
- Technical geography
- Time geography
- Timestamp
- Tobler's first law of geography
- Tobler's second law of geography
- Uncertain geographic context problem
