= Mei-Po Kwan =

Geographer

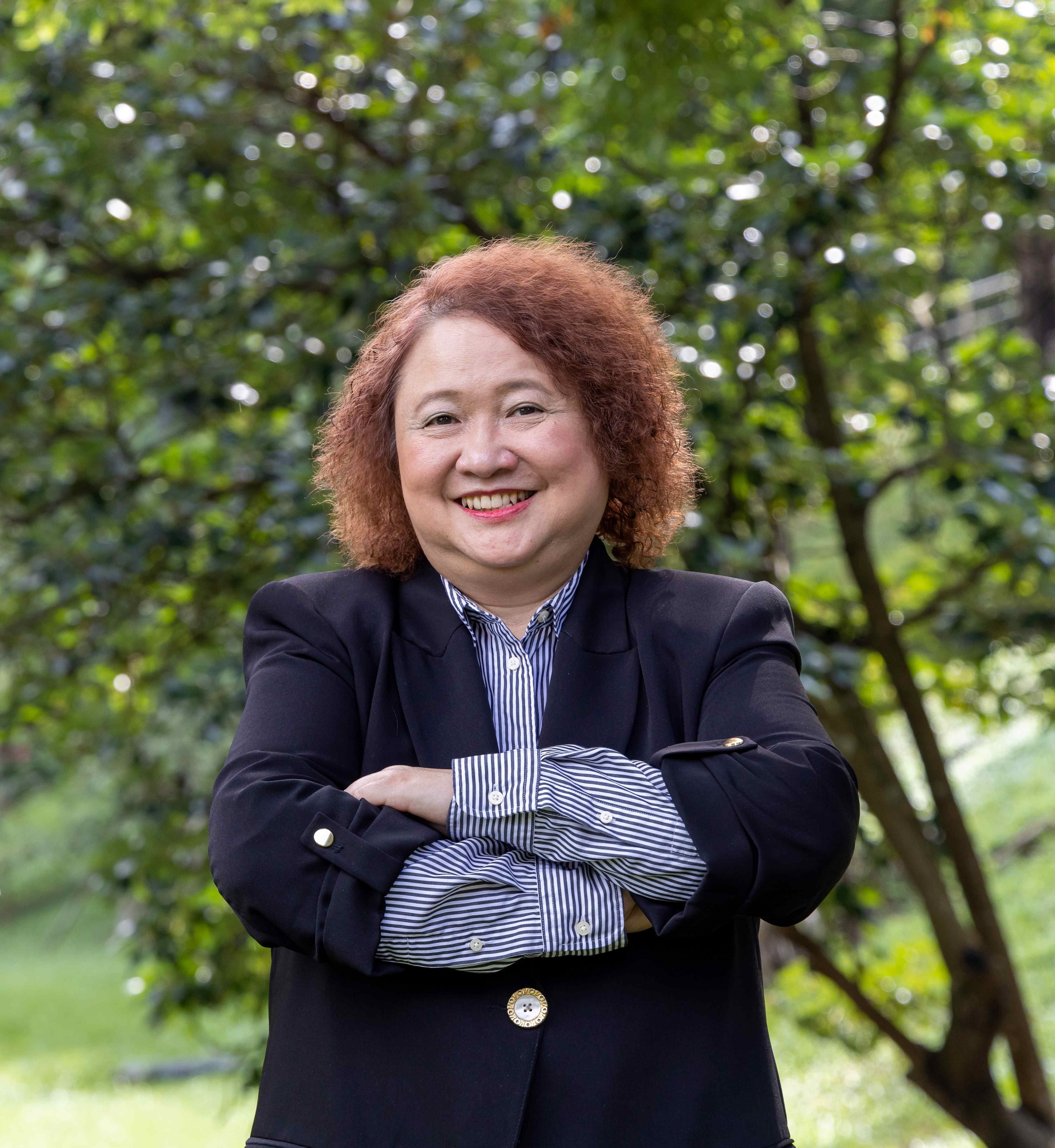

Mei-Po Kwan Professor of Geography and Resource Management, The Chinese University of Hong Kong (CUHK)
- Incumbent
- Assumed office August 2019

Director, Institute of Space and Earth Information Science, CUHK
- Incumbent
- Assumed office August 2019

Head, Chung Chi College, CUHK
- Incumbent
- Assumed office 1 August 2023

Director, Institute of Future Cities
- Incumbent
- Assumed office 2023

Personal details
- Education: The Chinese University of Hong Kong (BSSc); The University of California, Los Angeles (MA); The University of California, Santa Barbara (PhD)
- Occupation: The Ohio State University; University of Illinois Urbana-Champaign; The Chinese University of Hong Kong

Mei-Po Kwan (Chinese: 關美寶; born in March, 1962) is a geographer known for her research contributions in geographic information science, and human geography, particularly as they apply to time geography and human mobility. She is the Choh-Ming Li Professor of Geography and Resource Management at The Chinese University of Hong Kong (CUHK), director of the Institute of Space and Earth Information Science (ISEIS) of CUHK, director of the Institute of Future Cities of CUHK, and head of Chung Chi College of CUHK.

== Biography ==
Kwan was born in Hong Kong. Her favorite subject in secondary school was geography. When she entered CUHK, she picked nothing but geography as her major. She lived in the Theology Building, a Chung Chi College student hostel. During year 2 of her undergraduate study, she went on exchange at the International Christian University in Tokyo, Japan, for a year.

Kwan obtained her Bachelor of Social Science degree with first-class honors from CUHK in 1985; her master's degree in urban planning from the University of California, Los Angeles (UCLA) in 1989; and her Doctor of Philosophy degree in geography from the University of California, Santa Barbara (UCSB) in 1994. She developed her teaching and research career at the Ohio State University in 1995, and became a distinguished professor of social and behavioural sciences at the university. Between 2013 and 2019, she served as a professor of geography and geographic information science at the University of Illinois at Urbana-Champaign. Since 2019, she has been the Choh-Ming Li Professor of Geography and Resource Management and director of ISEIS of CUHK. Since 2023, she has been the head of Chung Chi College, CUHK, and director of the Institute of Future Cities of CUHK.

Led by Kwan, ISEIS held a ceremony in 2023 to launch a remote sensing satellite construction project, the first earth observation satellite construction project funded by the HKSAR Government. The research team will develop and launch the first CUHK satellite, which will participate in natural disaster monitoring, carbon neutrality, and sustainable development research.

== Research ==
Kwan has made groundbreaking contributions to diverse research areas, covering environmental health, urban travel and health issues in cities, sustainability, human mobility, and geographic information science (GIScience), among others. She discovered the Uncertain geographic context problem (UGCoP) and the Neighborhood effect averaging problem (NEAP). She is a leading worldwide researcher, having developed and deployed real-time GPS tracking and mobile sensing, such as air quality sensors, to collect individual-level data for environmental health research. She is also the first scientist who deploys remote sensing technologies for vehicle detection and develops Hong Kong's first low-earth orbit satellite.

Kwan emphasises the application of GIS in the research on health and urban geography, paying particular attention to the spatial and temporal characteristics of human daily activities, as well as the impact of the built environment and social environment on individual daily life experiences and well-being. Projects include the study of green space; women in sex work and the risk environment; youth and adult drug abuse; privacy issues caused by anti-epidemic measures; and the protection of geoprivacy via the development of a Geospatial Virtual Data Enclave (GVDE), among others.

In 2023, severe flooding was caused by Typhoon Haikui. The research team led by Kwan and Professor Ma Peifeng, vice-chancellor assistant professor of the Department of Geography and Resource Management, used the satellite's images to monitor and analyse the flooded areas and further evaluate the impact of the flooding.

== Achievements ==
Kwan has made pioneering and innovative contributions to multiple research areas, including environmental health, transport, social issues in cities, sustainability, human mobility, and GIScience, among others. Kwan has published over 570 books, journal articles, and book chapters; hosted and co-hosted over 50 researches funded by the U.S. National Science Foundation, the U.S. National Institutes of Health, the European Research Council, the National Natural Science Foundation of China, and the Hong Kong Research Grants Council. She is named Fellow of the World Academy of Science (TWAS), Fellow of the U.K. Academy of Social Sciences, Fellow of the Royal Geographical Society (UK), Fellow of the American Association for the Advancement of Science (AAAS), Fellow of the American Association of Geographers, Fellow of the Geographical Society of China, and Fellow of the International Society for Urban Informatics.

Kwan has delivered keynote speeches at renowned universities and institutes worldwide, including Harvard University, Massachusetts Institute of Technology (MIT), University of Oxford, Royal Swedish Academy of Letters, Royal Netherlands Academy of Arts and Sciences, and Chinese Academy of Sciences. She has delivered over 400 keynote addresses, invited lectures, and other invited presentations in more than 20 countries. Kwan was listed as a Highly Cited Researcher by Clarivate in 2019 and 2021, and ranked fourth internationally in the field of Geography by Standford University in 2022, and first nationally in the field of Geography by globalauthorid.com.

Kwan has served as an editor of Annals of the American Association of Geographers for 12 years, an editor of Regional Studies, an associate editor of Geographical Analysis, a national councillor of the Association of American Geographers (AAG), a member of the board of directors of the University Consortium for Geographic Information Science (UCGIS), general chair of GIScience 2012 International Conference, president of the International Association of Chinese Professionals in Geographic Information Sciences (CPGIS), and chair of AAG Health and Medical Geography Specialty Group and AAG GIS Specialty Group. She has also been an advisory panellist or reviewer of grant proposals of numerous science foundations and institutions, including the U.S. National Science Foundation, U.S. National Institutes of Health, European Research Council, Natural Sciences and Engineering Research Council of Canada, Austrian Science Fund, Australian Research Council, Royal Geographical Society (U.K.), Research Foundation of Flanders, Research Grants Council of Hong Kong, and Swiss National Science Foundation. Kwan has been on the editorial boards for over 100 journals.

== Awards ==
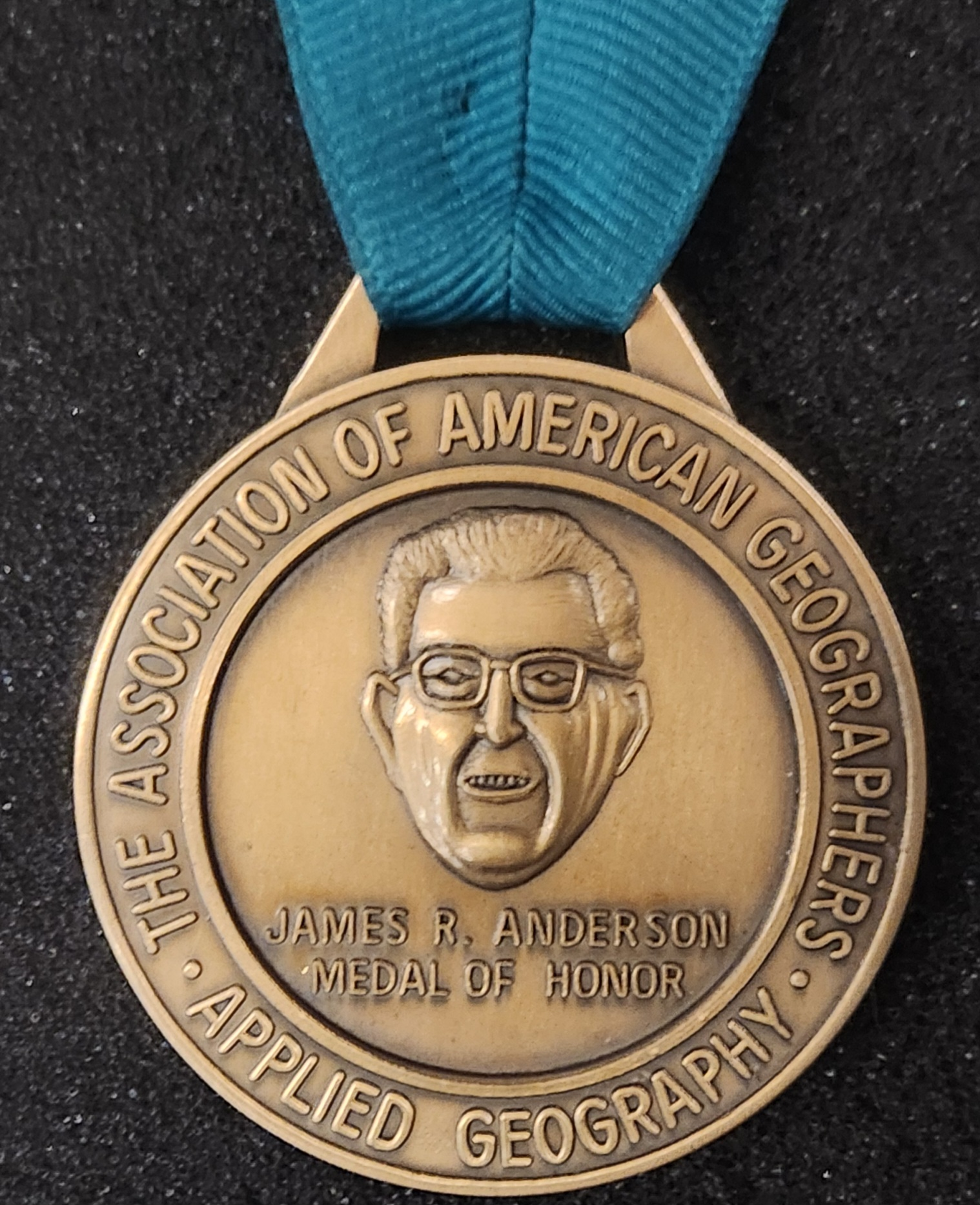
Anderson Medal of Honor

- 2004, Fellow, Royal Geographical Society
- 2005, University Consortium for Geographic Information Science (UCGIS) Research Award
- 2005, Edward L. Ullman Award, AAG Transportation Geography Specialty Group
- 2009, Fellow, American Association for the Advancement of Science (AAAS)
- 2011, Distinguished Scholarship Honors, Association of American Geographers (AAG), being the first female Asian recipient since the establishment of the Association
- 2016, E. Willard and Ruby S. Miller Award, American Association of Geographers
- 2016, Melinda S. Meade Distinguished Scholarship Award, AAG Health and Medical Geography Specialty Group
- 2016, Guggenheim Fellow
- 2017, Distinguished Scholar Award, International Association of Chinese Professionals in Geographic Information Sciences (CPGIS)
- 2017, Alan Hay Award in Transport Geography, Transport Geography Research Group of the Royal Geographical Society with the Institute of British Geographers (RGS-IBG)
- 2018, Stanley Brunn Award for Creativity in Geography, American Association of Geographers
- 2018, Fellow, U.K. Academy of Social Sciences
- 2019, Highly Cited Researcher 2019, Web of Science, Clarivate
- 2020, Fellow, American Association of Geographers
- 2021, Wilbanks Prize for Transformational Research in Geography, American Association of Geographers
- 2021, ranked third nationally in Social Sciences and Humanities according to Research.com
- 2021, Highly Cited Researcher 2021, Web of Science, Clarivate
- 2022, James R. Anderson Medal of Honor in Applied Geography, AAG Applied Geography Specialty Group
- 2022-2023, ranked the world's No. 4 in the field of Geography according to the list of the World's Top 2% Scientists by Stanford University
- 2023, Outstanding Achievement Award in Modeling Geographical Systems, Modeling Geographical Systems Commission (MGSC) of the International Geographical Union (IGU)
- 2023, ranked first nationally in Geography according to the "2023 Global Scholar Academic Impact Rankings" of globalauthorid.com.
- 2024, Lifetime Achievement Award, International Association of Chinese Professionals in Geographic Information Sciences (CPGIS)
- 2024, Fellow, Geographical Society of China
- 2024-2025, ranked the world's No. 5 in the field of Geography according to the list of the World's Top 2% Scientists by Stanford University
- 2025, Member, Hong Kong Academy of Sciences
- 2026, Fellow, The World Academy of Sciences (TWAS)

== See also ==
- Cynthia Brewer – American geographer (born 1960)
- Duane Marble – American geographer (1931–2022)
- George F. Jenks – American geographer and cartographer
- Michael Dacey – American geographer and spatial statistician
- Quantitative geography – Subfield of geographic methods
- Stewart Fotheringham – British-American geographer
- Technical geography – Study of spatial information
- Torsten Hägerstrand – Swedish geographer (1916–2004)
- Waldo R. Tobler – American geographer
- Yi-Fu Tuan – Chinese-American geographer (1930–2022)
