= Uncertain geographic context problem =

Source of statistical bias

In geography, public health, and other fields that study spatial relationships, the uncertain geographic context problem (UGCoP) is a methodological problem in which the geographic areas used in research to represent people's environments—such as neighborhoods, census tracts, administrative areas, or activity spaces—may differ from the places and periods that actually shape the phenomena being studied, potentially leading to misleading conclusions.

For example, a study that measures the effect of a person's residential neighborhood on health outcomes may overlook environmental influences encountered while working, traveling, or engaging in activities elsewhere. The term was coined by geographer Mei-Po Kwan in 2012.

== Introduction ==
The uncertain geographic context problem is a source of statistical bias that can affect the results of spatial analysis when data is grouped by geographic areas such as neighbourhoods or districts.

The core difficulty is that the geographic boundaries used to group data such as a census tract are often arbitrary and may not reflect where people actually spend their time. A person may live within one boundary but regularly travel outside it to work, shop, or go to school, meaning that the area used to represent them in a study may not capture the environment that actually influences their behaviour. The UGCoP is closely related to the modifiable areal unit problem (MAUP) and the ecological fallacy. It is particularly relevant in research on time geography, food access, and human mobility.

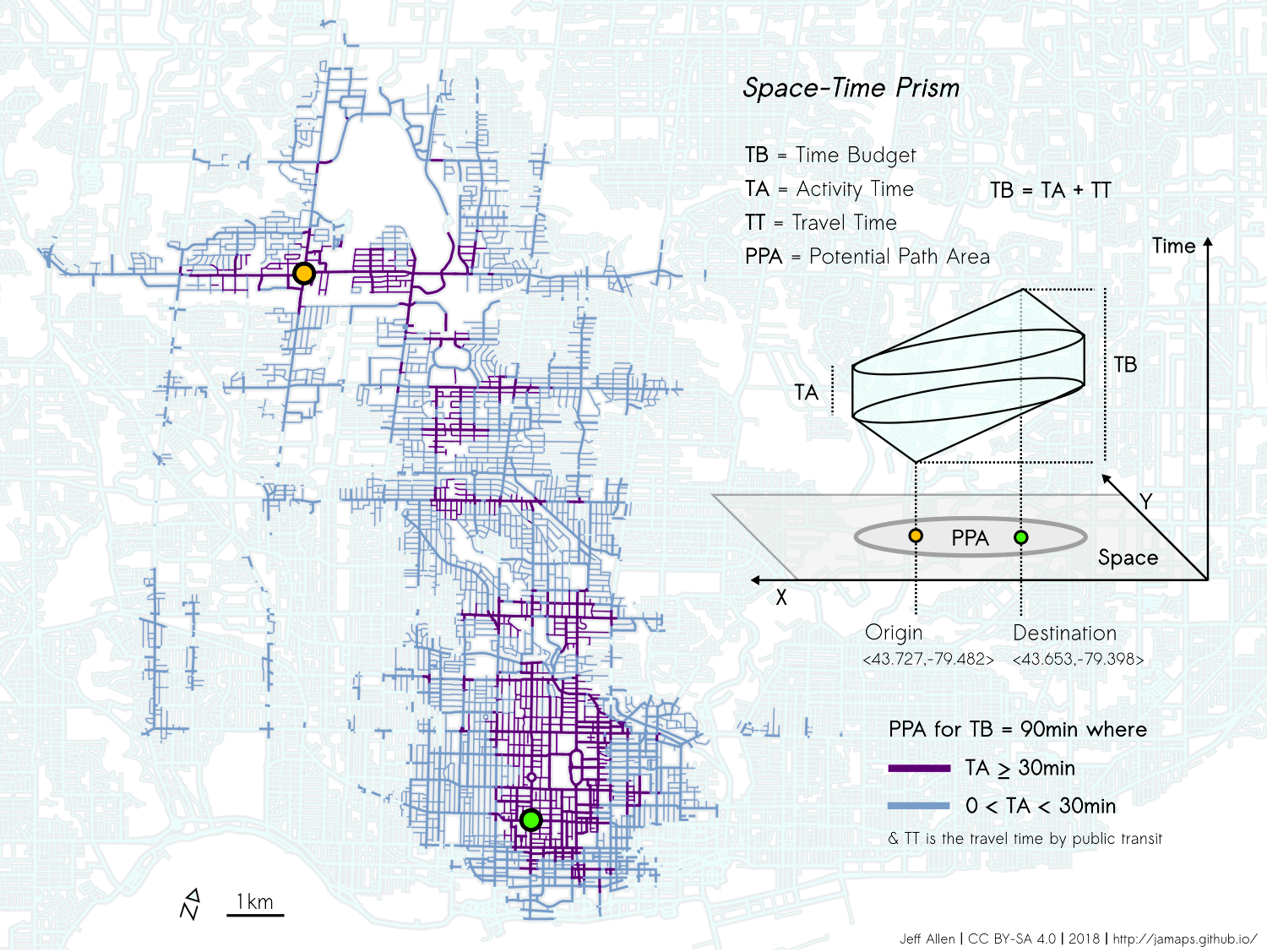
Schematic and example of a space-time prism using transit network data: On the right is a schematic diagram of a space-time prism, and on the left is a map of the potential path area for two different time budgets.

== Implications ==
The UGCoP has further implications when considering the area outside of a study area. Tobler's second law of geography states, "the phenomenon external to a geographic area of interest affects what goes on inside." As a study area is often a subset of the planet, data on the edges of the study area will be excluded. If the boundary demarcating the study area is permeable to travel, then the phenomena under investigation within it may extend beyond, and be impacted by, forces excluded from the analysis. This uncertainty contributes to the UGCoP.

Maps are inherently simplified representations of reality, and cartographers must ensure that a map's limitations are clearly documented in order to avoid misleading readers. With modern technology, there is an emphasis on individual-level data and understanding how individuals interact with their environment. When making maps with this individual-level data, the UGCoP is one source of bias that can impact the results of an analysis. When these results inform policy, they can have real world ramifications.

The UGCoP is particularly important when understanding food access and human mobility.

== Suggested solutions ==
Geographic information systems, along with technologies that can monitor the position of individuals in real time, are possible methods for addressing the UGCoP. These technologies allow scientists to analyze and visualize the 3D space-time path of people moving through a study area, and better understand their actual activity space. Web GIS has also been employed to address the UGCoP by allowing researchers to better contextualize subjects' real and perceived activity space. These technologies have helped to address the problem by moving away from aggregate data and introducing a temporal component to the modeling of subject activity.

== See also ==
- Arbia's law of geography
- Automotive navigation system
- Collaborative mapping
- Concepts and Techniques in Modern Geography
- Counter-mapping
- Distributed GIS
- Geographic information systems in geospatial intelligence
- GIS and aquatic science
- GIS and public health
- GIS in archaeology
- Historical GIS
- List of GIS data sources
- List of GIS software
- Map database management
- Modifiable temporal unit problem
- Neighborhood effect averaging problem
- Participatory GIS
- QGIS
- Technical geography
- Tobler's first law of geography
- Tobler's second law of geography
- Traditional knowledge GIS
- Virtual globe
