= Absence rate =

In economics, the absence rate is the ratio of workers with absences to total full-time wage and salary employment. In the United States, absences are defined as instances when persons who usually work 35 or more hours per week worked less than 35 hours during the reference week for one of the following reasons: own illness, injury, or medical problems; childcare problems; other family or personal obligations; civic or military duty; and maternity or paternity leave.

== Statistics ==
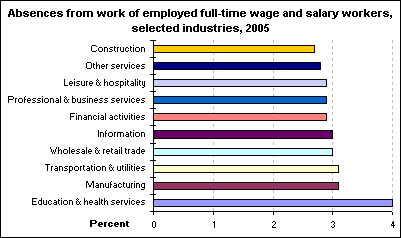
Absence rates by industry in 2005

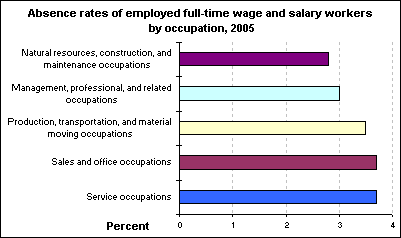
Absence rates by occupation in 2005

In 2005, workers in the education and health services sector had the highest absence rate in the private sector at 4.0 percent, while workers in natural resources, construction, and maintenance occupations and in management, professional, and related occupations had the lowest absence rates.

The Bureau of Labor Statistics reported an absence rate of 3.2 percent for full-time wage and salary workers in 2025, using an average of 11 months that leaves out October. Illness or injury accounted for 2.2 percentage points of that rate, and all other reasons for 1.0.

Other countries measure absence differently. In the United Kingdom, the Office for National Statistics estimates a sickness absence rate from the Labour Force Survey as the share of total working hours lost to sickness or injury, rather than the share of workers with an absence. By that measure the rate was 2.0 percent in 2024, down from 2.3 percent in 2023, equal to about 4.4 days lost per worker. A third approach counts days rather than people or hours: the World Health Organization's European Health for All database reports working days lost per employee per year to sickness or injury, drawn mostly from national sick-leave registration systems. Its notes warn that coverage differs by country, for example Germany records only absences longer than three working days, so the figures are not fully comparable.

== Differences across sectors and occupations ==
In 2025 the absence rate in the public sector was 4.2 percent, compared with 3.0 percent in the private sector. Federal government workers had the highest rate of any major industry group, at 5.0 percent, while agriculture and construction had the lowest, at 2.3 percent each. Among occupation groups, service occupations had the highest rate (3.7 percent) and natural resources, construction, and maintenance occupations the lowest (2.9 percent).

== Lost worktime rate ==
Alongside the absence rate, the Bureau of Labor Statistics publishes a lost worktime rate, defined as hours absent as a percentage of hours usually worked. Because it counts hours rather than people, it is closer in concept to the sickness absence rate used in the United Kingdom. In 2025 the lost worktime rate for full-time wage and salary workers was 1.7 percent, of which 1.1 percentage points were due to illness or injury.

== See also ==
- Bureau of Labor Statistics
- Current Population Survey
