= Mobility =

Mobility may refer to:

== Social sciences and humanities ==
- Economic mobility, ability of individuals or families to improve their economic status
- Geographic mobility, the measure of how populations and goods move over time
- Social mobility, movement of people between one social classes or economic levels
- Individual mobility, a demographic concept
- Mobilities, a contemporary paradigm in the social sciences and humanities that explores the movement of people, ideas and things
  - Hypermobility (travel), the social aspects and environmental impacts of excessive travel

== Transportation ==
- Mobility (transportation), the broader experience around transport
  - Private transport, e.g., car-based
  - Sustainable transport, refers to the broad subject of transport that is or approaches being sustainable
  - Active mobility (also known as soft mobility), based on non-motorized transportation methods

== Arts, entertainment, and media ==
- Mobility (chess), the ability of a chess piece to move around the board and chess game
- "Mobility" (song), a 1990 song by Moby
- Mobility (video game), a 2001 computer game
- Mobility, a 2023 short film and winner of the British Academy Television Award for Best Short Form in 2024

== Computing and telecommunications ==
- Mobile computing, human–computer interaction by which a computer is expected to be transported during normal usage
- Mobility model, model of the motion of users of mobile phones and wireless ad hoc networks
- Personal mobility, the ability of telecommunication user to access services on the basis of a personal identifier

== Education ==
- Academic mobility, students and teachers in higher education studying or teaching elsewhere for a limited time
- Apprentices mobility, students and teachers in vocational education, or training studying or teaching elsewhere for a limited time

== Physics ==
- Electrical mobility, ability of charged particles to move through a medium
- Electron mobility, how quickly an electron can move through a metal or semiconductor
- Electrophoretic mobility, the velocity of a dispersed charged particle in electrophoresis

== Other uses ==
- Mobility (military), the ability of military units or weapon systems to move to an objective
- Mobility Carsharing, car sharing cooperative of Switzerland
- Functional mobility, one of the basic activities of daily living (ADL) in the fields of health care and rehabilitation
- E-mobility known as electric vehicle (EV)

== See also ==
- Flexibility (anatomy), a.k.a. limberness, the range of movement in a joint or series of joints
- Logistics, the management of the flow of resources between points to meet some requirements
- Mobile (disambiguation)
- Mobility aid, a device designed to assist walking
- Mobilization, the act of assembling and making both troops and supplies ready for war
- Motility, a biological term which refers to the ability to move spontaneously and actively, consuming energy in the process
- Motion (physics), a change in position of an object with respect to time and its reference point
