= Scale (geography) =

Level at which a phenomenon occurs or is described

In geography, scale is the level at which a geographical phenomenon occurs or is described. This concept is derived from the map scale in cartography. Geographers describe geographical phenomena and differences using different scales. From an epistemological perspective, scale is used to describe how detailed an observation is, while ontologically, scale is inherent in the complex interaction between society and nature.

== Scale effect ==
The concept of scale is central to geography. To study any geographical phenomenon, one must first determine the scale or resolution, because different scales or resolutions may result in different observations and hence different conclusions. This problem is called scale effect or scale dependency. For example, the answer to the famous question "How Long Is the Coast of Britain" is highly dependent on the choice of cartographic scales.

In cartography and spatial analysis, scale effect and zoning effect (different ways of zoning lead to different statistical outcomes) combined can lead to modifiable areal unit problem (MAUP).

== Types ==
Spatio-temporal hierarchies in landscape ecology
Scale	Spatial (m^{2})	Temporal (yr)
Micro-	10^{0} - 10^{6}	1 -500
Meso-	10^{6} - 10^{10}	500 - 10,000
Macro-	10^{10} - 10^{12}	10,000 - 1,000,000
Mega-	10^{12} -	1,000,000 -

In geography, the term "scale" can be spatial, temporal, or spatio-temporal, but often (though not always) means spatial scale in spatial analysis. In different contexts, "scale" could have very different connotations, which could be classified as follows:

- Geographic scale or the scale of observation: the spatial extent of a study. E.g. a spatial analysis of the entire United States might be considered a large-scale one, while a study on a city has a relatively small scale.
- Cartographic scale or map scale: a large-scale map covers a smaller area but embodies more detail, while a small-scale map covers a larger area with less detail.
- Operational scale: the spatial extent at which a particular phenomena operates. E.g. orogeny operates at a much larger scale than the formation of a river pothole does.

== See also ==
- Geologic time scale
- Modifiable areal unit problem (MAUP)
- Modifiable temporal unit problem (MTUP)
