= USC Price School of Public Policy =

Public policy school of the University of Southern California

Coordinates: 34.01939°N 118.28356°W

USC Sol Price School of Public Policy
- Type: Private public policy school
- Established: 1929
- Parent institution: University of Southern California
- Academic affiliations: TPC
- Dean: Christopher G. Boone
- Faculty: 250
- Undergraduates: 763
- Postgraduates: 765
- Doctoral students: 81
- Location: Los Angeles, California, United States
- Campus: Urban
- Website: priceschool.usc.edu

The USC Sol Price School of Public Policy (USC Price) is the public policy school of the University of Southern California, a private university in Los Angeles, California. The school offers programs in the fields of public policy and management, health policy and management, real estate development, urban planning and spatial analysis, and nautical science.

== History ==
Urban planning classes were first delivered at USC in Fall of 1921 by Gordon Whitnall, who was instrumental in founding the Planning Commission of the City of Los Angeles. In 1929, the USC School of Citizenship and Public Administration opened its doors, becoming one of only two programs of its kind in the nation. The school did not resemble very much the larger complex school it is today, but it contained the seeds of what is currently the modern USC Price.

In addition to offering a degree in public administration, the School of Citizenship and Public Administration included classes in urban and regional planning from the outset, which eventually led to the urban and regional planning degree and school at USC. Over time, the School of Public Administration formed the health administration program and the public policy program.

In 1955, the School of Public Administration and the School of Architecture and Fine Arts instituted a graduate program in city and regional planning. The graduate planning program grew into an independent academic unit in the 1960s. In 1971, the Irvine Foundation gave its first USC grant to establish an endowed chair in urban and regional planning. In 1974, the USC Board of Trustees merged the Graduate Program in Urban and Regional Planning with the Center for Urban Studies to create the School of Planning and Urban Studies, subsequently the School of Urban and Regional Planning, the first planning program in the nation to achieve status as an independent school. The Irvine foundation provided the new school with an additional endowment for the support of graduate students. The school's undergraduate program was offered jointly with the School of Public Administration.

The School of Urban and Regional Planning formed a graduate program in real estate development in 1985, and founded the Lusk Center for Real Estate Development in 1988 with a private donation, with naming rights, from John Lusk and his family. The school also launched a new undergraduate program to complement its existing program with the School of Public Administration. A gift from Ralph Lewis and his wife Goldy, the co-founders of Lewis Homes, enabled the School to break ground for a new building on May 24, 1995, USC's Ralph and Goldy Lewis Hall. The School was renamed the School of Urban Planning and Development in 1996; and in 1998, the USC Board of Trustees merged the School of Urban Planning and Development with the School of Public Administration to form the School of Policy, Planning, and Development. The Lusk Center for Real Estate Development was reorganized into Lusk Center for Real Estate, a university-level research unit jointly administered by USC Price and the USC Marshall School of Business.

In November 2011, the Price Family Charitable Fund gave a $50 million naming gift to honor the life and legacy of USC alumnus Sol Price, founder of Price Club. The school was renamed the USC Sol Price School of Public Policy with the shortened name of USC Price.

== People ==
=== Notable alumni ===
- Shinzō Abe (studied for three semesters, but dropped out in 1979), Prime Minister of Japan (2006–2007, 2012–2020)

=== Notable faculty ===
- Marlon Boarnet
- Geoff Boeing
- Christopher G. Boone
- Elizabeth Currid-Halkett
- Dana Goldman
- Jeffrey W. Talley, professor and former lieutenant general
- Ehsan Zaffar, visiting fellow at the Bedrosian Center for Governance and civil rights lawyer
