= Indicators of spatial association =

Indicators of spatial association are statistics that evaluate the existence of clusters in the spatial arrangement of a given variable. For instance, if we are studying cancer rates among census tracts in a given city local clusters in the rates mean that there are areas that have higher or lower rates than is to be expected by chance alone; that is, the values occurring are above or below those of a random distribution in space.

== Global indicators ==
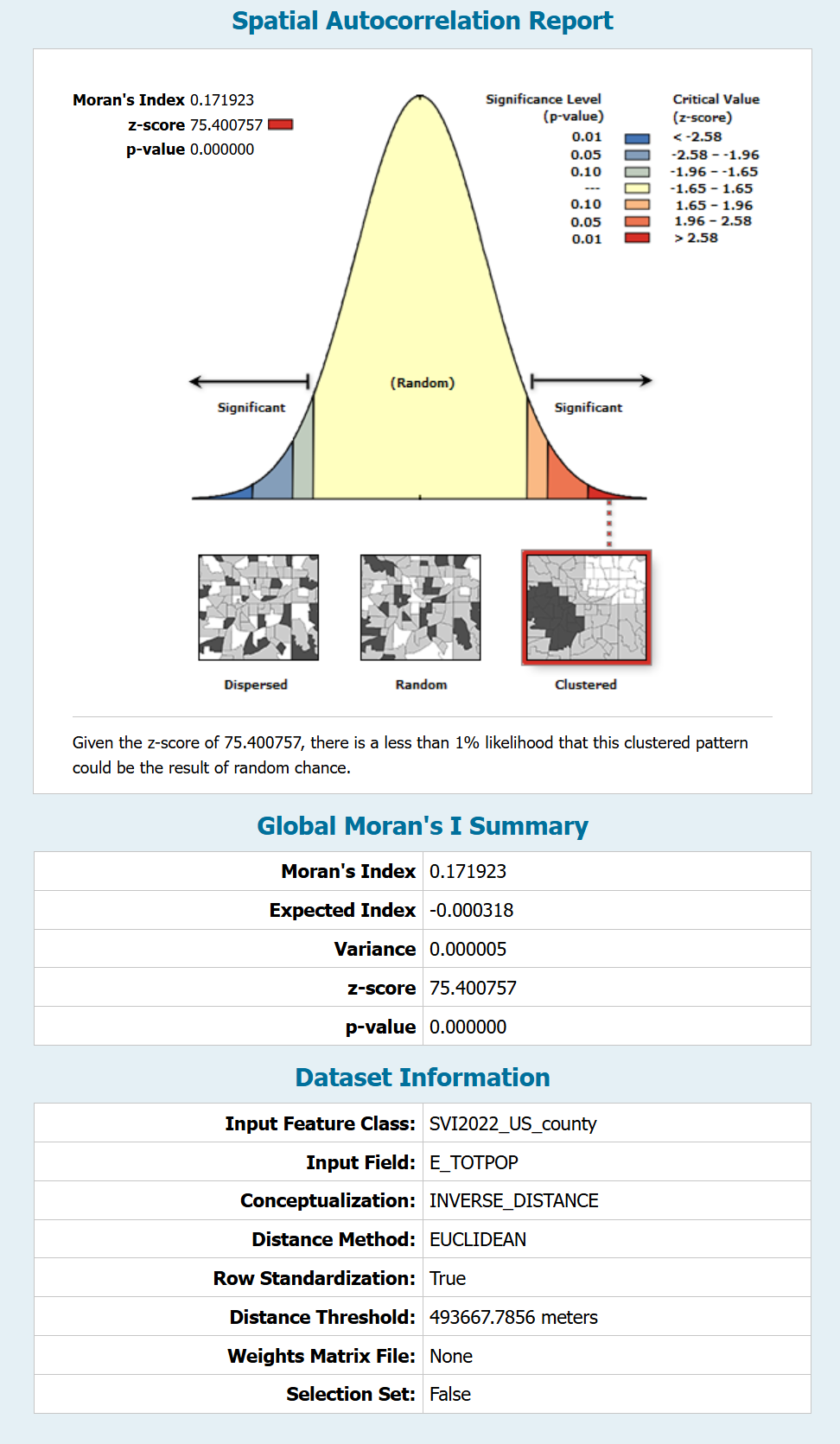
Spatial Autocorrelation Report generated by ArcGIS Pro for 2022 U.S. county population

Notable global indicators of spatial association include:

- Global Moran's I: The most commonly used measure of global spatial autocorrelation or the overall clustering of the spatial data developed by Patrick Alfred Pierce Moran.
- Geary's C (Geary's Contiguity Ratio): A measure of global spatial autocorrelation developed by Roy C. Geary in 1954. It is inversely related to Moran's I, but more sensitive to local autocorrelation than Moran's I.
- Getis–Ord G (Getis–Ord global G, Geleral G-Statistic): Introduced by Arthur Getis and J. Keith Ord in 1992 to supplement Moran's I.

== Local indicators ==
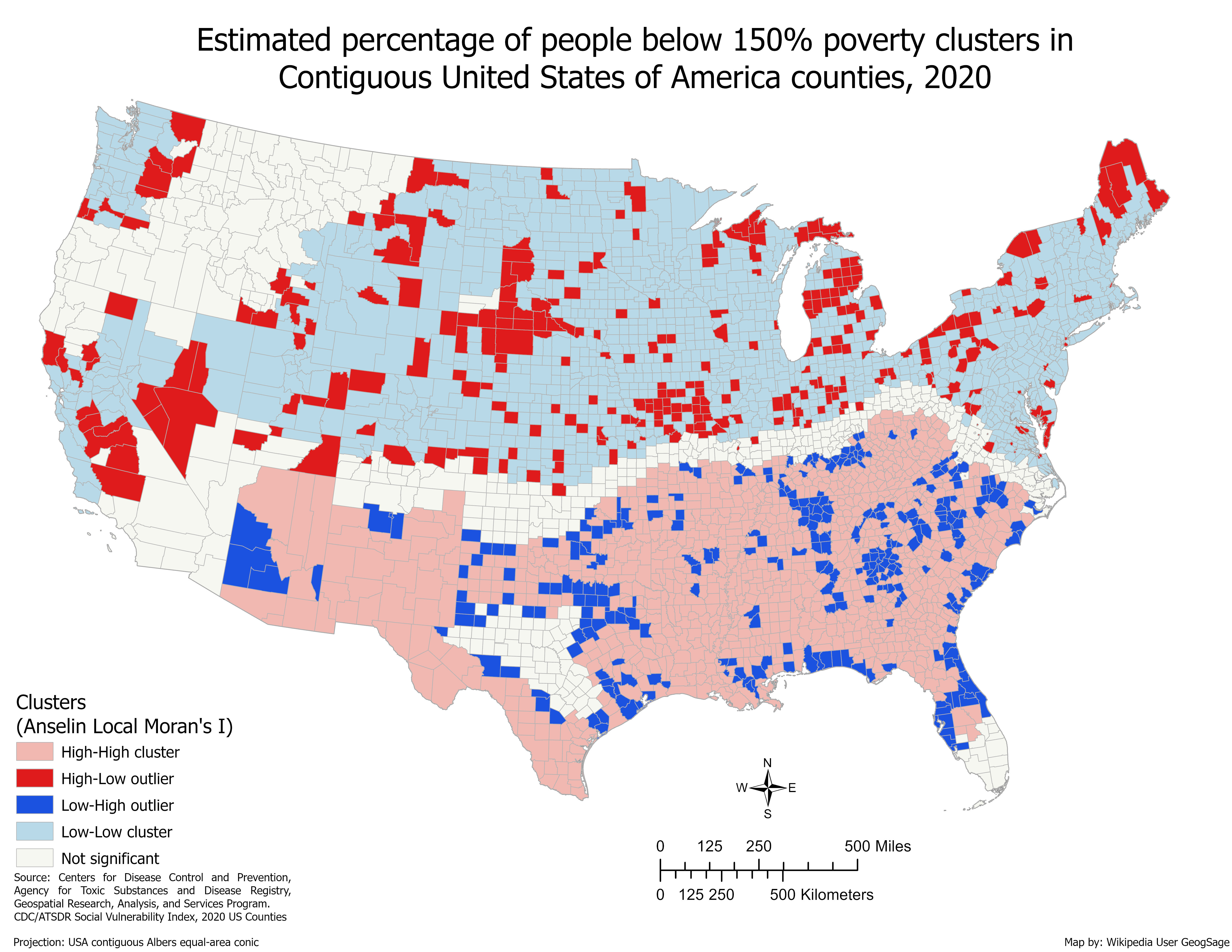
Clusters of the estimated percent of people in poverty by county in the contiguous United States in 2020

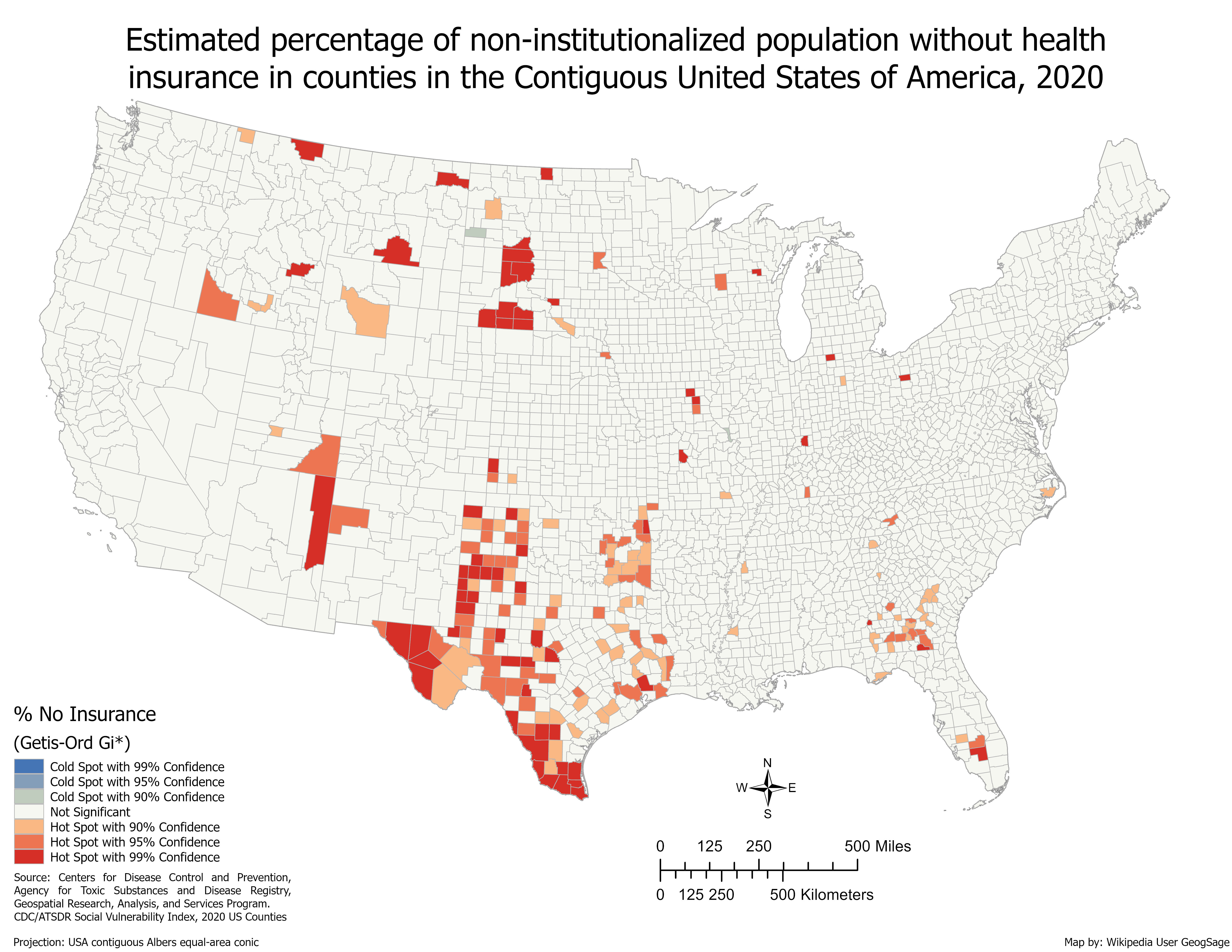
HotSpot map of the estimated percent of non-institutionalized population without health insurance, by county in the contiguous United States in 2020

Notable local indicators of spatial association (LISA) include:

- Local Moran's I: Derived from Global Moran's I, it was introduced by Luc Anselin in 1995 and can be computed using GeoDa.
- Getis–Ord G_{i} (local G_{i}): Developed by Getis and Ord based on their global G.
- INDICATE's I_{N}: Originally developed to assess the spatial distribution of stars, can be computed for any discrete 2+D dataset using python-based INDICATE tool available from GitHub.

== See also ==
- Spatial analysis
- Tobler's first law of geography
