= Spatial variability =

Spatial variability occurs when a quantity that is measured at different spatial locations exhibits values that differ across the locations. Spatial variability can be assessed using spatial descriptive statistics such as the range.

Let us suppose that the Rev' z(x) is perfectly known at any point x within the field under study. Then the uncertainty about z(x) is reduced to zero, whereas its spatial variability still exists. Uncertainty is closely related to the amount of spatial variability, but it is also strongly dependent upon sampling.

Geostatistical analyses have been strictly performed to study the spatial variability of pesticide sorption and degradation in the field. Webster and Oliver provided a description of geostatistical techniques. Describing uncertainty using geostatistics is not an activity exempt from uncertainty itself as variogram uncertainty may be large and spatial interpolation may be undertaken using different techniques.

== Literature ==
- Isaaks, E.H., Srivastava R.M.: Applied Geostatistics. 1989
- Fortin, Marie-Josee, Dale, Mark.: Spatial Analysis A Guide for Ecologists. 2005. Cambridge University Press, 365 pp.
- Kristensen, Terje; Ohlson, Mikael; Bolstad, Paul; Nagy, Zoltan (2015-07-24). "Spatial variability of organic layer thickness and carbon stocks in mature boreal forest stands—implications and suggestions for sampling designs". Environmental Monitoring and Assessment. 187 (8). Springer Science and Business Media LLC: 521. Bibcode:2015EMnAs.187..521K. doi:10.1007/s10661-015-4741-x. ISSN 0167-6369. PMID 26205281. S2CID 6396005.
- Delhomme, J. P. (1979). "Spatial variability and uncertainty in groundwater flow parameters: A geostatistical approach". Water Resources Research. 15 (2). American Geophysical Union (AGU): 269–280. Bibcode:1979WRR....15..269D. doi:10.1029/wr015i002p00269. ISSN 0043-1397.* Cambardella, C. A.; Moorman, T. B.; Novak, J. M.; Parkin, T. B.; Karlen, D. L.; Turco, R. F.; Konopka, A. E. (1994). "Field-Scale Variability of Soil Properties in Central Iowa Soils". Soil Science Society of America Journal. 58 (5). Wiley: 1501–1511. Bibcode:1994SSASJ..58.1501C. doi:10.2136/sssaj1994.03615995005800050033x. ISSN 0361-5995.* Novak, J. M.; Moorman, T. B.; Cambardella, C. A. (1997). "Atrazine Sorption at the Field Scale in Relation to Soils and Landscape Position". Journal of Environmental Quality. 26 (5). Wiley: 1271–1277. Bibcode:1997JEnvQ..26.1271N. doi:10.2134/jeq1997.00472425002600050011x. ISSN 0047-2425.* Jacques, D; Mouvet, C; Mohanty, B; Vereecken, H; Feyen, J (1999). "Spatial variability of atrazine sorption parameters and other soil properties in a podzoluvisol" (PDF). J Contam Hydrol. 36 (1): 31–52. Bibcode:1999JCHyd..36...31J. doi:10.1016/S0169-7722(98)00141-7.
- Price, OR; Walker, A; Wood, M; Oliver, MA (2001). "Using geostatistics to evaluate spatial variation in pesticideysoil interactions". In Walker A. (ed.). Pesticide behaviour in soils and water. BCPC Symposium Proceedings No. 78. Farnham, UK. pp. 233–238.
- Webster, R (2007). Geostatistics for environmental scientists. Chichester Hoboken, NJ: Wiley. ISBN 978-0-470-02858-2. OCLC 212122100.
- Jansen, Michiel J.W. (1998). "Prediction error through modelling concepts and uncertainty from basic data". Nutrient Cycling in Agroecosystems. 50 (1/3). Springer Science and Business Media LLC: 247–253. Bibcode:1998NCyAg..50..247J. doi:10.1023/a:1009748529970. ISSN 1385-1314. S2CID 38278687.
- Dubus, Igor G; Brown, Colin D; Beulke, Sabine (2003). "Sources of uncertainty in pesticide fate modelling". Science of the Total Environment. 317 (1–3). Elsevier BV: 53–72. Bibcode:2003ScTEn.317...53D. doi:10.1016/s0048-9697(03)00362-0. ISSN 0048-9697. PMID 14630412.
