= Regional Research Institute =

Research center at West Virginia University

The Regional Research Institute (RRI) at West Virginia University is a university-wide regional science research center for graduate students and faculty members in the fields of economics, resource economics, geography, history and sociology. Professor William H. Miernyk, a regional economist trained at Harvard, came to West Virginia University and founded RRI and served as the 1st Director. Since its opening in 1965, the Regional Research Institute has helped scholars do research. For numerous individuals, both at West Virginia University and elsewhere, it has provided crucial encouragement, stimulation, and opportunities. Its programs involve faculty members, graduate students, and an extensive network of scholars in the United States and abroad.

== About ==
The Regional Research Institute conducts and promotes interdisciplinary research on the economic and social development of lagging regions. As a center of regional research excellence for more than four decades, the RRI has served as an international recognized center for the advancement of regional science-an interdisciplinary field at the intersection of geography, economics, and planning.

The orientation William H. Miernyk established is at the heart of the Institute today:

- The Regional Research Institute exists for scholarly research. Scholars define the research projects, and scholars evaluate the proposals and results. The overall objective is to increase knowledge through publication of journal articles and books.
- Graduate students are an integral part of the institute. As their educations progress, so do their roles on research projects. They learn research skills, conduct and publish research, and present papers at conferences in the U.S. and worldwide.
- The scope of the Institute extends beyond the economic and social problems of Appalachia to similar regions elsewhere. It incorporates an enduring focus on quantitative methods for studying regions and evaluating policy directions.
- The Institute encourages and nurtures international and multidisciplinary research. It organizes conferences and seminars, initiates research activities, creates research opportunities abroad, and hosts visiting scholars.

For 50 years, the Regional Research Institute has helped scholars do research. For numerous individuals, both at West Virginia University and elsewhere, it has provided crucial encouragement, stimulation, and opportunities. Its programs involve faculty members, graduate students, and an extensive network of scholars in the United States and abroad.

== Directors ==
- William H. Miernyk, 1965–1983
- Robert Saunders, acting director, 1969–1970
- Patrick C. Mann, Interim, 1983–1984
- Andrew M. Isserman, 1985–1997
- Brian J. Cushing, acting director, 1991
- Luc Anselin, Interim Director, 1997–1998
- Scott Loveridge, 1999–2000
- Ronald L. Lewis, Interim Director, 2000–2001
- Randall W. Jackson, Director, 2001-2022
- Heather M. Stephens, 2023-

== Research Assistant Professors ==
Two faculty positions were created at the RRI in 1985. They are non-tenure track, two-to-three year appointments for recent Ph.D.s capable of becoming leading scholars. The research assistant professors conduct their own research, participate in joining research projects, and generally teach one course per year.

- Paul M. Beaumont, 1985-1987
- Robert Walker, 1985-1987
- Mary Beth Pudup, 1986-1989
- PhilipShapira, 1988-1990
- Carla Dickstein, 1988-1990
- Stephen Fournier, 1991-1993
- Terance Rephann, 1993-1994
- Stephan Weiler, 1994-1996
- Cynthia Rogers, 1994-1997
- Emily Talen, 1995-1998
- Attila Varga, 1997-1998
- Oleg Smirnov, 1998
- Ge Lin, 2000-2005
- Shaoming Cheng, 2006-2008
- Randall Rosenberger, 2000-2002
- Gianfranco Piras, 2010-2014

== Research Associates ==
One faculty-equivalent position was created in 2005. These individuals are non-tenure track, three-year appointments for more senior Ph.D. researchers capable of becoming leading scholars. The research associates conduct their own research, participate in RRI research projects, and contribute to instruction by committee participation, teaching course modules, and presenting guest lectures and seminars.

Hodjat Ghadimi, 2005-2010

== Research Associate Professor ==
This is a tenured, joint position; 50 percent of the appointment is with the RRI, 25 percent of the appointment is with Agricultural and Resource Economics and 25 percent of the appointment is with Economics.

Donald J. Lacombe, 2010-

== Web Book of Regional Science ==
The Web Book of Regional Science was initiated in 2001–present. It brings together on one website comprehensive descriptions of many of the basic concepts, analytical tools and policy issues important to regional science. As of 2020, the Web book series hosts PDFs for the entire Scientific Geography Series.

Selective publications are listed below:

Classics in Regional Science

- An Introduction to Regional Economics, Edgar M. Hoover and Frank Giarratani
- The 1975 West Virginia Input-Output Study: Modeling a Regional Economy, Anthony L.Loviscek, Randy E. Holliday, Lucinda A. Robinson, and Melissa A Wolford
- Elements of Input-Output Analysis, William H. Miernyk
- Optimal Location of Facilities, Gerard Rushton
- Scientific Geography Series, Grant Ian Thrall, editor
- Land Use and Urban Form, Grant Ian Thrall

Methods or Empirically Oriented Contributions

- Analysis of Land Use Change: Theoretical and Modeling Approaches, Helen Briassoulis
- Computable General Equilibrium Modeling for Regional Analysis, Eliécer E. Vargas, Dean F. Schreiner, Gelson Tembo, and David W. Marcouiller
- Industrial and Regional Clusters: Concepts and Comparative Applications, Edward M. Bergman and Edward J. Feser
- An Introduction to State and Local Public Finance, Thomas A. Garrett and John C. Weatherman
- Keystone Sector Identification: A Graph Theory-Social Network Analysis Approach, Maureen Kilkenny and Laura Nalbarte
- Migration and Local Labor Markets, Stephan J.Goetz
- Regions in Changing Economic Environment, Gennadi Kazakevitch and Sharn Enzinger
- Regional Impact Models, William Schaffer
- Spatial Econometrics, James LeSage

Policy or Practice Oriented Contributions

- Community Preparedness for Site Development, William Grunkemeyer, Myra Moss, and Jerold R. Thomas
- The Geography of the New Economy, R. D. Norton
- Key Concepts in Sustainable Development, William Grunkemeyer and Myra Moss
- Regional Governance, Institutions and Development, Mike Danson and Geoff Whittam
- Site Planning and Design, Steven B. McBride
- Poverty, Inequality and Social Justice in Nonmetropolitan America, Don Albrecht

== Sources ==
- Regional Research Institute
- Regional Research Institute Timeline from 1965 to 2010 RRI Timeline Updated May-2015
