= Stone–Geary utility function =

The Stone–Geary utility function takes the form
$$U = \prod_{i} (q_i-\gamma_i)^{\beta_{i}}$$
where $U$ is utility, $q_i$ is consumption of good $i$, and $\beta$ and $\gamma$ are parameters.

For $\gamma_i = 0$, the Stone–Geary function reduces to the generalised Cobb–Douglas function.

The Stone–Geary utility function gives rise to the Linear Expenditure System. In case of $\sum_i \beta_i =1$ the demand function equals
$$q_i = \gamma_i + \frac{\beta_i}{p_i} (y - \sum_j \gamma_j p_j)$$
where $y$ is total expenditure, and $p_i$ is the price of good $i$.

The Stone–Geary utility function was first derived by Roy C. Geary, in a comment on earlier work by Lawrence Klein and Herman Rubin. Richard Stone was the first to estimate the Linear Expenditure System.
