= Spatial statistics =

Field of applied statistics

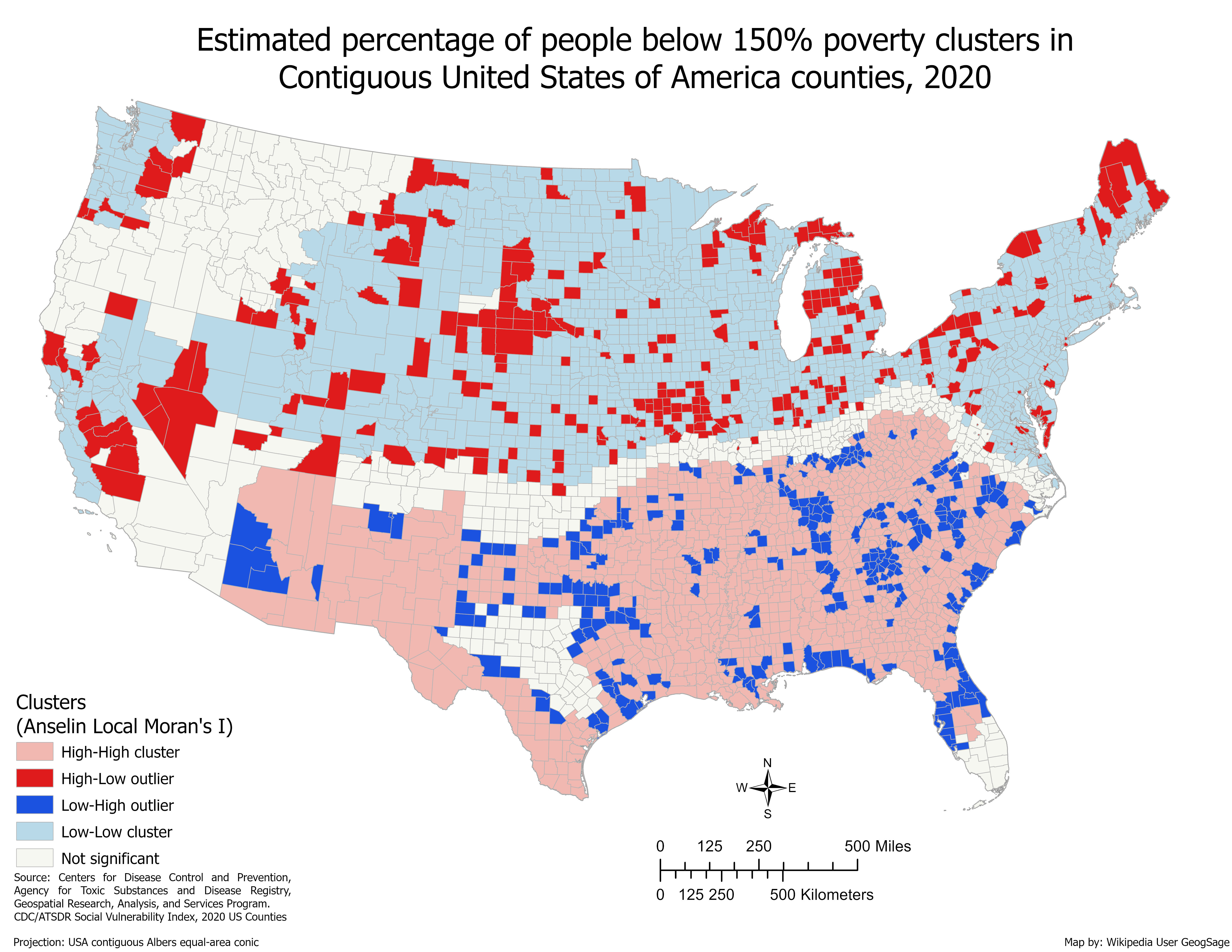
Map of poverty clusters in the United States made using spatial statistics.

Spatial statistics is a field of applied statistics dealing with spatial data. It involves stochastic processes (random fields, point processes), sampling, smoothing and interpolation, regional (areal unit) and lattice (gridded) data, point patterns, as well as image analysis and stereology.

Traditional statistics generally assume observations are independent of one another, with dependence between them being a violation of this assumption. In contrast, spatial statistics explicitly accounts for dependence (or spatial autocorrelation) by directly incorporating spatial-locational information into its analysis. Rather than treating it as a violation, it is recognized as an integral part of the results. This approach is grounded in Tobler's First Law of Geography, which is also the basis of many core concepts of spatial statistics:

"Everything is related to everything else, but near things are more related than distant things." —Waldo Tobler, 1969.

This law suggests that proximity directly affects how phenomena interact, and since all phenomena are to occur somewhere, geographic components are inherent in nearly all data. Location or spatial data are therefore foundational to addressing a variety of problems, such as resource assessment, environmental monitoring, and medical imaging. Applying a spatial perspective allows the visualization and prediction of trends or patterns, providing relevant insights or information that can help with spatial planning and/or making informed decisions.

Key areas in the study of spatial statistics include defining the structures and types of spatial data, techniques for data collection, core methodologies in analysis, the application of these methods in the real world, and any limitations that may arise.

== Spatial data ==
Spatial data is any measurement or observation of data associated with a geographical location, including its geometric and topological characteristics. Some subsets of spatial data include spatial statistical data and geographic data.

=== Spatial statistical data ===
Spatial statistical data covers the quantitative analysis and modeling of spatial data. It deals with the statistical properties (values, counts, or rates) of the geographical attributes of an occurrence. Examples of these attributes can include population density, temperature, or disease incidence. This data can be categorized into three main types: point data (geostatistics), areal (or lattice) data, and spatial point patterns.

==== Point data ====
Point data is a basic type of spatial data collected at specific geographic locations. These data can be represented as point patterns, with each point identified by its coordinates and associated descriptive attributes. Point data is commonly used to examine how objects or events are distributed across a geographical area. This can include mapping positions of natural features, such as individual trees and animal nesting sites, as well as human settlements and the occurrence of geological events. These points are contained within a defined geographic boundary known as a study region.

Point data can be analyzed using two approaches: first-order and second-order analysis. First-order analysis examines spatial variations in the average density or intensity of points across a study region. In contrast, second-order analysis focuses on the spatial relationships between points, examining how their locations are associated with one another to identify patterns such as clustering or dispersion.

==== Areal data ====
Areal data is a type of spatial data used to analyze individual polygons or groups of polygons within a geographic region. It is commonly applied in landscape ecology, particularly when studying land cover, habitat distribution, and the relationship between different areas. Two important characteristics of areal data in the study of animal movement are connectivity and barriers. Connectivity refers to whether different habitats areas are linked, allowing animals to move between them. In contrast, barriers such as rivers, mountains, and highways can separate habitats and restrict animal movement.

Although areal data is less commonly analyzed than point data, it provides valuable information about the characteristics and spatial relationships of geographic areas. Common examples include land cover regions, census units, and electoral districts. Areal data is typically collected through satellite imagery, thematic maps, and census maps.

==== Spatial point patterns ====
The spatial point patterns show how the spatial relationship between individual point features. Spatial point patterns are generally separated into three different groups: random, uniform, and clustered distributions. Random spatial point patterns refer to when points are distributed randomly and the occurrence of each point is independent. Uniform points are points that imply a sense of evenness between each point. Clustered points are points that are found within a locality, meaning that they are found closer to each other.

=== Geographic data ===
Geographic data is a subset of spatial data that refers to information specifically linked to a location or area in geographic space, often represented through spatial elements such as coordinates (e.g., latitude and longitude) or boundaries. These spatial elements of geographic data are primarily modelled using vector data (points, lines, or polygons) or raster data (structured as grids of cells or pixels).

The collection, management, and analysis of geographic data are facilitated by geographic information systems (GIS). The geographic data is integrated with computer software tools and resources through georeferencing. These systems are widely used to handle spatial data because they help visualize, process, and interpret patterns and relationships in spatial statistical analysis. They are able to combine spatial, qualitative, and quantitative data all under a single framework.

== Data collection ==
=== Spatial experimental and observational design ===
In spatial experimental design, researchers manipulate variables to optimize outcomes and test causal relationships. Moreover, rather than relying solely on a posteriori statistical adjustments, spatial data collection under this design requires researchers to plan the physical layout and pair primary observations with precise spatial metadata before beginning their trials. An example of this includes the location or placement/mapping of agricultural soil treatment plots.

Opposed to spatial experimental design, observational study design does not involve the manipulation of variables; the outcome is not altered as data is collected opportunistically, without intervention. It is also typically used when a spatial experimental study approach is unethical and unsafe to control or manipulate the variables. Spatial data collection under this design relies on passive methods. Examples of this include remote sensing, satellite imaging, or field surveys.

=== Spatial sampling ===
As it is difficult or usually impractical to gather data from an entire population or an area of interest, spatial sampling is used. It involves the selection of samples from a smaller subset of locations within a specific region, which can be used to estimate and make inferences about the entirety of a population or study area if the sample size is sufficient. The four common methods of spatial sampling include: random sampling, systematic sampling, clustered sampling, and stratified random sampling.

Random sampling refers to samples that are not biased and are chosen completely at random, allowing an equal chance of selection for every point. Systematic sampling is when points are chosen at fixed intervals to ensure even coverage of the study area. Clustered sampling groups nearby points and collects samples from just a few of those clusters, rather than sampling single points scattered across the study area. Stratified random sampling is not concerned with the actual action of sampling, but is a method to organize the space of the samples into uniform sub-areas of equal size and shape. Then, any of the other three methods is to be performed in these sub-areas.

== Methods ==
=== Descriptive spatial statistics ===
==== Spatial dependence and spatial autocorrelation ====
Both spatial dependence and spatial autocorrelation are concepts based on Tobler's First Law of Geography. Spatial dependence refers to the influence that nearby geographical locations have on a phenomenon and their direct correlation to that event. By considering spatial dependence, the efficiency of sampling and estimation improves (as nearby points are expected to share close information). Spatial autocorrelation aims to describe the measurable pattern or result of the influence from spatial dependence. A common measure of spatial autocorrelation in spatial statistical methodologies is Moran's I. It is also required for the determination of kriging weights.

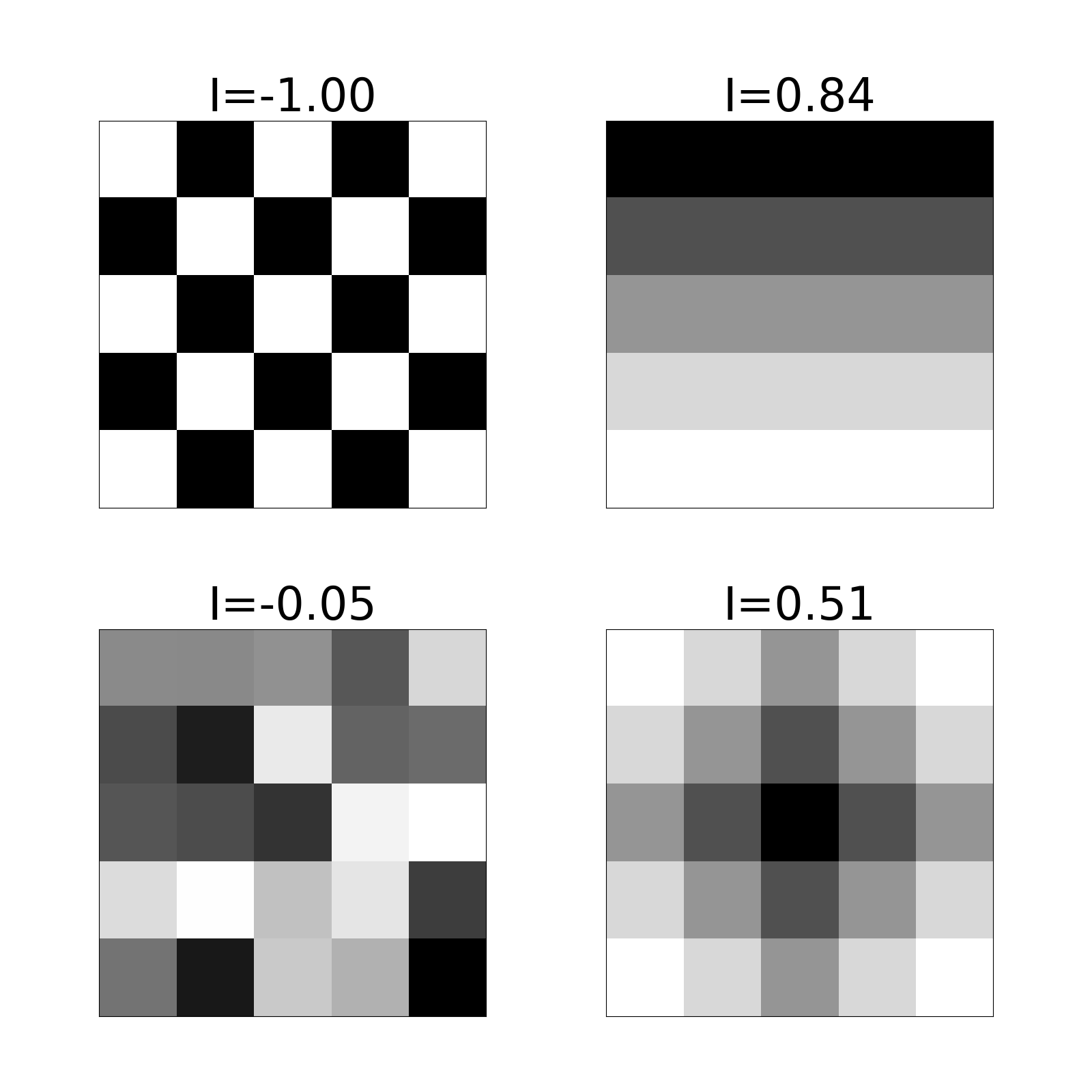
Spatial patterns corresponding to different values of Moran's I. With top left illustrating dispersion (I < 0), bottom left illustrating random data (I ≈ 0), and top right and bottom right illustrating clustered (I > 0) distributions.

==== Spatial autocorrelation (Moran's I) ====
Spatial autocorrelation describes the spatial relationship and influences between neighboring observations. Observations that are closer together have a greater chance of interacting and influencing one another than observations that are farther apart. Spatial autocorrelation can be measured using Moran's I, which considers interactions between neighboring observations through assigned weights. Moran's I is calculated from the difference between each observation's attribute value and the mean of all observation units, using weights based on spatial adjacency.

=== Inferential spatial statistics ===
==== Null and alternative hypotheses ====
In spatial statistics, the null hypothesis is commonly used to test for randomness, such as whether a spatial pattern follows a Poisson process. The alternative hypothesis considers other possible spatial patterns, such as clustering, where certain areas have a higher or lower intensity than the rest of the pattern. Since there are many possible alternative patterns, a single test statistic may not provide enough information to identify them. Simulations can be used to compare observed data with patterns generated by a statistical process.

==== Error and uncertainty ====
Error and uncertainty in spatial statistics can arise from challenges in fitting models to large spatial datasets, particularly when observations are irregularly located. Even when assuming a Gaussian process, selecting and estimating models can be difficult due to computational limitations. Certain approximations, such as low-rank models, may perform poorly and produce inefficient results in spatial interpolation. Model accuracy can be assessed using methods such as Kullback-Leibler divergence, which compares differences in expected log-likelihood between models.

=== Spatial statistical methods ===
==== Spatial regression ====
Spatial regression is used to analyze relationships between observations across different geographic regions. It can be applied to economic or population data collected from neighboring regions. Spatial autoregression models use weighting matrices to represent connections between regions based on shared boundaries, distances, or transportation costs. Spatial regression can also be used to examine correlations between observations or residuals after accounting for explanatory variables. However, positively correlated errors can affect the accuracy of regression models and lead to overly complex trend surfaces.

==== Spatial interpolation (kriging) ====
Spatial interpolation is used to estimate values at locations using nearby observations or a weighted combination of neighboring observations. Kriging is a geostatistical interpolation method that uses semivariograms to estimate values for regionalized variables. Several types of kriging exist, including ordinary kriging, universal kriging, block kriging, and co-kriging. Ordinary kriging is the most common type and is considered the best linear unbiased estimator cause it minimizes the variance of interpolation residuals and produces residuals with a mean of zero. Ordinary kriging suits stationary data without drift, while universal kriging identifies and removes drift before interpolating the residuals and adding them back to the drift. The choice of kriging method depends on the nature of the data being analyzed.

== Applications of spatial statistics ==
=== Ecology and environmental science ===
Spatial statistics can be applied in ecology and environmental science to study habitat size, connectivity, and animal movement. In landscape ecology, larger habitat areas may indicate greater dominance within a landscape. Spatial analysis can also examine connectivity and barriers between habitats to understand animal migration. Natural features, such as rivers and mountains, and human-made structures, such as highways, can act as barriers that restrict movement between habitats. Additionally, habitats may overlap with different land cover types, such as forests and shrubs.

A wildlife overpass spanning the Trans-Canada Highway in Banff National Park. This is an example of how the application of spatial statistical methods can help maintain landscape connectivity for animal habitats, supporting wildlife populations.

=== Epidemiology and public health ===
Spatial statistics can be applied in epidemiology and public health to analyze cases of communicable diseases, such as COVID-19. These cases can be represented as point observations within a defined geographic study region, with each point identified by its coordinates. Spatial autocorrelation can also be used to analyze the distribution of disease cases. For example, community-transmitted COVID-19 cases in New Zealand's North Island were analyzed using Geary's ratio and Moran's I, with data organized by 15 district health boards.

=== Geography and urban planning ===
Spatial statistics can be applied in geography and urban planning through spatial partitioning, also known as zoning. This involves dividing large geographic areas into smaller, non-overlapping regions to improve management, resource allocation, and the distribution of responsibilities. Spatial partitioning is commonly used for school zoning, residential development, census data collection, and administrative services. For example, cities can be divided into zones for housing development, waste collection, and school attendance. Spatial partitioning is also important because it influences how spatial data are collected and interpreted.

== Limitations ==
=== Modifiable areal unit problem (MAUP) ===
The reliability of using spatial statistical data is limited by how geographic areas are divided and aggregated. This limitation is known as the modifiable areal unit problem (MAUP), a statistical bias that can arise from aggregating spatial data, due to altering the size, shape (or zone), or orientation of spatial units in the geographical data used. This causes variations in results, despite the same analysis being applied to the same data. It can emerge as two different forms: the scale effect and the zone effect.

==== The scale effect ====
The scale effect refers to the impacts caused when the scale (size) of a spatial aggregation is changed; it occurs because smaller spatial units are merged into fewer, larger ones, resulting in an alteration of spatial resolution of the data.

An example of this was demonstrated in a 2025 study done by Lingchao Meng on urban park accessibility in central Nanjing China. By comparing baseline accessibility at the individual building level against estimates aggregated into varying sizes of grid units, Meng found that smaller scales (250-500 metres) closely aligned with building-level results and showed minimal statistical bias. Though, in the larger scales upwards of 1000 metres, aggregation introduced statistical error and skewed estimates. It overestimated park access, which falsely portrayed that it was equitable between areas that evidently were not when observed at building level. In summary, adjusting to an area scale too large triggers the MAUP, leading to errors that can cause misinformed spatial or urban planning decisions if not addressed during spatial statistical analysis.

==== The zone effect ====
The zone effect occurs when the scale of analysis is fixed, but the shape of the aggregation units (or boundaries) of the areas of study are changed. If the points are constant in a given region, but new boundaries are chosen, this creates new zoning systems that alter how those points are grouped. It leads to that variation in results, even though the points have not changed.

An example of this was demonstrated by David W.S. Wong in 2004, who compared two national zoning systems in the United States. The Bureau of the Census divided the country into nine census divisions, while the U.S Environmental Protection Agency divides it into ten regions. Although both systems analyze the same country at the same, fixed scale, their boundaries differ. In summary, the MAUP occurred because when tabulating the same data but on differing boundaries, the zonal systems provided different spatial statistical results. Similar to the scale effect, this could also lead to misinformed decision-making if not addressed.

== See also ==
- Geostatistics
- Modifiable areal unit problem
- Spatial analysis
- Spatial econometrics
- Statistical geography
- Spatial epidemiology
- Spatial network
- Statistical shape analysis
