= Spatial descriptive statistics =

Methods used in statistics

Spatial descriptive statistics is the intersection of spatial statistics and descriptive statistics; these methods are used for a variety of purposes in geography, particularly in quantitative data analyses involving Geographic Information Systems (GIS).

== Types of spatial data ==
The simplest forms of spatial data are gridded data, in which a scalar quantity is measured for each point in a regular grid of points, and point sets, in which a set of coordinates (e.g. of points in the plane) is observed. An example of gridded data would be a satellite image of forest density that has been digitized on a grid. An example of a point set would be the latitude/longitude coordinates of all elm trees in a particular plot of land. More complicated forms of data include marked point sets and spatial time series.

== Measures of spatial central tendency ==
The coordinate-wise mean of a point set is the centroid, which solves the same variational problem in the plane (or higher-dimensional Euclidean space) that the familiar average solves on the real line — that is, the centroid has the smallest possible average squared distance to all points in the set.

== Measures of spatial dispersion ==
Dispersion captures the degree to which points in a point set are separated from each other. For most applications, spatial dispersion should be quantified in a way that is invariant to rotations and reflections. Several simple measures of spatial dispersion for a point set can be defined using the covariance matrix of the coordinates of the points. The trace, the determinant, and the largest eigenvalue of the covariance matrix can be used as measures of spatial dispersion.

A measure of spatial dispersion that is not based on the covariance matrix is the average distance between nearest neighbors.

== Measures of spatial homogeneity ==
A homogeneous set of points in the plane is a set that is distributed such that approximately the same number of points occurs in any circular region of a given area. A set of points that lacks homogeneity may be spatially clustered at a certain spatial scale. A simple probability model for spatially homogeneous points is the Poisson process in the plane with constant intensity function.

=== Ripley's K and L functions ===
Ripley's K and L functions introduced by Brian D. Ripley are closely related descriptive statistics for detecting deviations from spatial homogeneity. The K function (technically its sample-based estimate) is defined as

$$\widehat{K}(t) = \lambda^{-1} \sum_{i\ne j} \frac{I(d_{ij}<t)} n,$$

where d_{ij} is the Euclidean distance between the i^{th} and j^{th} points in a data set of n points, t is the search radius, λ is the average density of points (generally estimated as n/A, where A is the area of the region containing all points) and I is the indicator function (i.e. 1 if its operand is true, 0 otherwise). In 2 dimensions, if the points are approximately homogeneous, $\widehat{K}(t)$ should be approximately equal to πt^{2}.

For data analysis, the variance stabilized Ripley K function called the L function is generally used. The sample version of the L function is defined as

$$\widehat{L}(t) = \left( \frac{\widehat{K}(t)} \pi \right)^{1/2}.$$

For approximately homogeneous data, the L function has expected value t and its variance is approximately constant in t. A common plot is a graph of $t - \widehat{L}(t)$ against t, which will approximately follow the horizontal zero-axis with constant dispersion if the data follow a homogeneous Poisson process.

Using Ripley's K function it can be determined whether points have a random, dispersed or clustered distribution pattern at a certain scale.

== See also ==
- Geostatistics
- Variogram
- Correlogram
- Kriging
- Cuzick–Edwards test for clustering of sub-populations within clustered populations
- Spatial autocorrelation
- Moran's I
