= GeoPandas =

Python library for geographic vector data

- Original author: Kelsey Jordahl
- Developer: GeoPandas contributors
- Release: July 2014
- Stable release: 1.2.0 / September 28, 2026; 42 days ago
- Written in: Python
- Operating system: Cross-platform
- Type: Software library
- License: BSD 3-Clause License
- Website: geopandas.org
- Repository: github.com/geopandas/geopandas

GeoPandas is a free and open-source Python library for working with geographic vector data. It extends pandas with geometry aware GeoSeries and GeoDataFrame data structures. The library supports geometric operations, coordinate reference system transformations, file input and output, and plotting. It is used in scientific and applied geospatial work, and several geospatial computing textbooks cover it.

== History ==
Kelsey Jordahl began GeoPandas during the 2013 SciPy Conference. Version 0.1.0 was released in July 2014, and Joris Van den Bossche became the lead maintainer in 2016. Version 1.0.0 was released on 24 June 2024.

== Features ==
The GeoSeries and GeoDataFrame data structures extend the pandas Series and DataFrame data structures. A GeoSeries stores Shapely geometry objects. A GeoDataFrame combines one or more geometry columns with tabular attributes and designates one geometry column as active. The geometries can represent points, lines, and polygons, including multipart geometries.

GeoPandas associates geometries with coordinate reference system metadata and provides transformations between coordinate systems. Its spatial operations include buffering, intersections, unions, overlays, dissolves, and spatial joins. The library reads and writes vector data formats supported by GDAL, using pyogrio as its default input/output engine. GeoDataFrames can be plotted with Matplotlib.

== Usage ==
Several scientific studies have used GeoPandas for spatial analysis. The OSMnx software library uses GeoDataFrame objects to represent OpenStreetMap features. Additionally, several textbooks on geospatial analysis introduce the library. For example, McClain's Python for Geospatial Data Analysis includes a chapter on GeoPandas and spatial statistics. Mastering Geospatial Analysis with Python covers GeoPandas in a chapter on vector data analysis. Geocomputation with Python relies on GeoPandas as one of its principal packages, and Geographic Data Science with Python introduces its use for spatial joins for feature engineering.

== See also ==
- pandas
- PySAL
- GDAL
