= Geoff Boeing =

American academic and urban planning scholar

- Occupation: Professor

Academic background
- Education: University of California, Berkeley (PhD)

Academic work
- Discipline: Urban planning, geographic information science, network science
- Institutions: University of Southern California; Northeastern University; University of California, Berkeley
- Website: geoffboeing.com

Geoff Boeing is an American academic and urban planning scholar. His research focuses on the built environment, network science, and geographic information science. He is an associate professor and the chair of the Department of Urban Planning and Spatial Analysis at the University of Southern California (USC), where he directs the Urban Data Lab. He has also served as a Nonresident Senior Fellow at the Brookings Institution. Boeing developed OSMnx, a software package for modeling and analyzing street networks, and is known for his research on urban street network structure and spatial patterns.

== Academic career ==
Boeing received his PhD in city and regional planning from the University of California, Berkeley in 2017. After completing his PhD, he worked as a postdoctoral researcher in Berkeley's Urban Analytics Lab and then as an assistant professor at Northeastern University. He later joined USC's Department of Urban Planning and Spatial Analysis and was appointed department chair in 2026. He also holds the Margaret and John Ferraro endowed chair at USC.

== Research ==
Boeing's research focuses on urban geography and the outcomes of urban planning, drawing on network science, complexity science, geographic information science, and machine learning. His work has explored street network design, urban accessibility, air pollution exposure, and rental housing markets.

He developed and maintains OSMnx, an open-source Python software package that uses OpenStreetMap data to model and analyze street networks and other geospatial features. OSMnx is widely used in urban planning and transportation research. Using OSMnx, Boeing documented a long-term decline in connected, grid-like street layouts in the United States over the 20th century, followed by a partial resurgence in the 21st century. He has also used it to measure the orientation and order of city street patterns around the world and release open data models and indicators of the street networks of every urban area in the world.

His 2022 study in The Lancet Global Health, coauthored with James F. Sallis and others, developed open spatial indicators of urban design and transport for cities around the world. Boeing's work with Michael Batty has examined the history and development of urban analytics as a field. His research with Marc Barthelemy has explored the characteristics of urban street network structure and demonstrated how such networks could form from simple processes.

== Professional service and honors ==
Boeing is a member of the founding executive committee of the Global Observatory of Healthy and Sustainable Cities, which received a 2025 Nobel Sustainability Trust Sustainability Award. He received the 2020 Stough-Johansson Springer Award for his research on the evolution of American street network planning and design. His work on OSMnx received the 2025 Zephyr Foundation Exceptional Technical Achievement Award and his research on city street network orientations was shortlisted for the 2018 Information is Beautiful Awards.

He has served on the editorial boards of several academic journals, including Urban Studies, Annals of the American Association of Geographers, Cities, Environment and Planning B: Urban Analytics and City Science, and Geographical Analysis.
