= Christopher G. Boone =

Dean at ASU

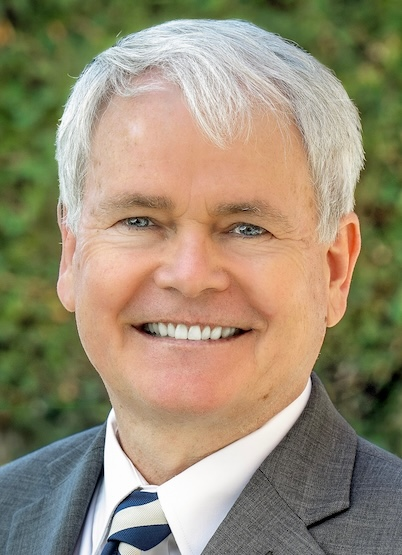
- Dean Christopher Boone

Dean of the USC Sol Price School of Public Policy
- Incumbent
- Assumed office January 1, 2025
- Preceded by: Genevieve Giuliano

Personal details
- Born: Kingston, Ontario, Canada
- Education: Queen's University (BA Honours 1987); University of Toronto (MA 1989, PhD 1994); McGill University (Post-doctoral fellow 1993–95)

Christopher G. Boone is Dean and the C. Erwin and Ione L. Piper Chair of the Sol Price School of Public Policy at the University of Southern California. He is the former dean of the ASU School of Sustainability and the founding dean of the College of Global Futures at ASU. Boone is a co-founder and Past President of the National Sustainability Society, an organization created to develop sustainability as a coherent, transdisciplinary scholarly field, support the growth of sustainability programs in colleges and universities, and convene and connect sustainability researchers, practitioners, employers, and graduates. For the National Academies of Science, Engineering, and Medicine, he serves on the Roundtable on Science and Technology for Sustainability. He is an elected fellow of the National Academy of Public Administration. For the Tyler Prize for Environmental Achievement, he serves on the executive committee. He has held visiting professor positions in the Department of Biology at Georgetown University and in the Yale School of the Environment.

== Education ==
Boone received his Ph.D. in geography from the University of Toronto in 1994 and holds a master's degree from the same institution. In 1987, he received a Bachelor of Arts degree with honours from Queen's University in Kingston, Ontario, Canada. From 1993 to 1995, he was a post-doctoral fellow in the School of Environment at McGill University funded by the Social Sciences and Humanities Research Council of Canada.

== Research ==
His research expertise focuses on urbanization, sustainability, and environmental justice. He was an investigator for two Long Term Ecological Research Network projects based in Baltimore and Phoenix and funded by the US National Science Foundation. Both projects examine the structure and function of urban ecosystems and how to use that understanding to support sustainability initiatives in cities. He served on the scientific steering committee of the Urbanization and Global Environmental Change Programme, a Future Earth project.

He has published in a broad range of journals and has co-authored three books:

- Strengthening Sustainability Programs and Curricula at the Undergraduate and Graduate Levels (2020) with Anne Kapuscinski, Arun Agrawal, Erin Bromaghim, Garrick Louis, and Dorceta Taylor ISBN 0-309-67839-0
- City and Environment (2006) with Ali Modarres ISBN 9781282568006
- Urbanization and Sustainability: Linking ecology, environmental justice, and global environmental change (2003) with Michail Fragkias ISBN 9789400756663
