= Geary's C =

Measure of spacial autocorrelation

Geary's C is a measure of spatial autocorrelation developed by Roy C. Geary. that attempts to determine if observations of the same variable are spatially autocorrelated globally (rather than at the neighborhood level). Spatial autocorrelation is more complex than autocorrelation because the correlation is multi-dimensional and bi-directional.

== Global Geary's C ==
The generalised Geary coefficient is defined as

$$C = \frac{(N-1) \sum_{i} \sum_{j} w_{ij} (x_i-x_j)^2}{2 S_0 \sum_{i}(x_i-\bar x)^2}$$

where $N$ is the number of spatial units indexed by $i$ and $j$; $x$ is the variable of interest; $\bar x$ is the mean of $x$; $w_{ij}$ is the $i^{th}$ row of the spatial weights matrix $W$ with zeroes on the diagonal (i.e., $w_{ii} = 0$); and $S_0$ is the sum of all weights in $W$.

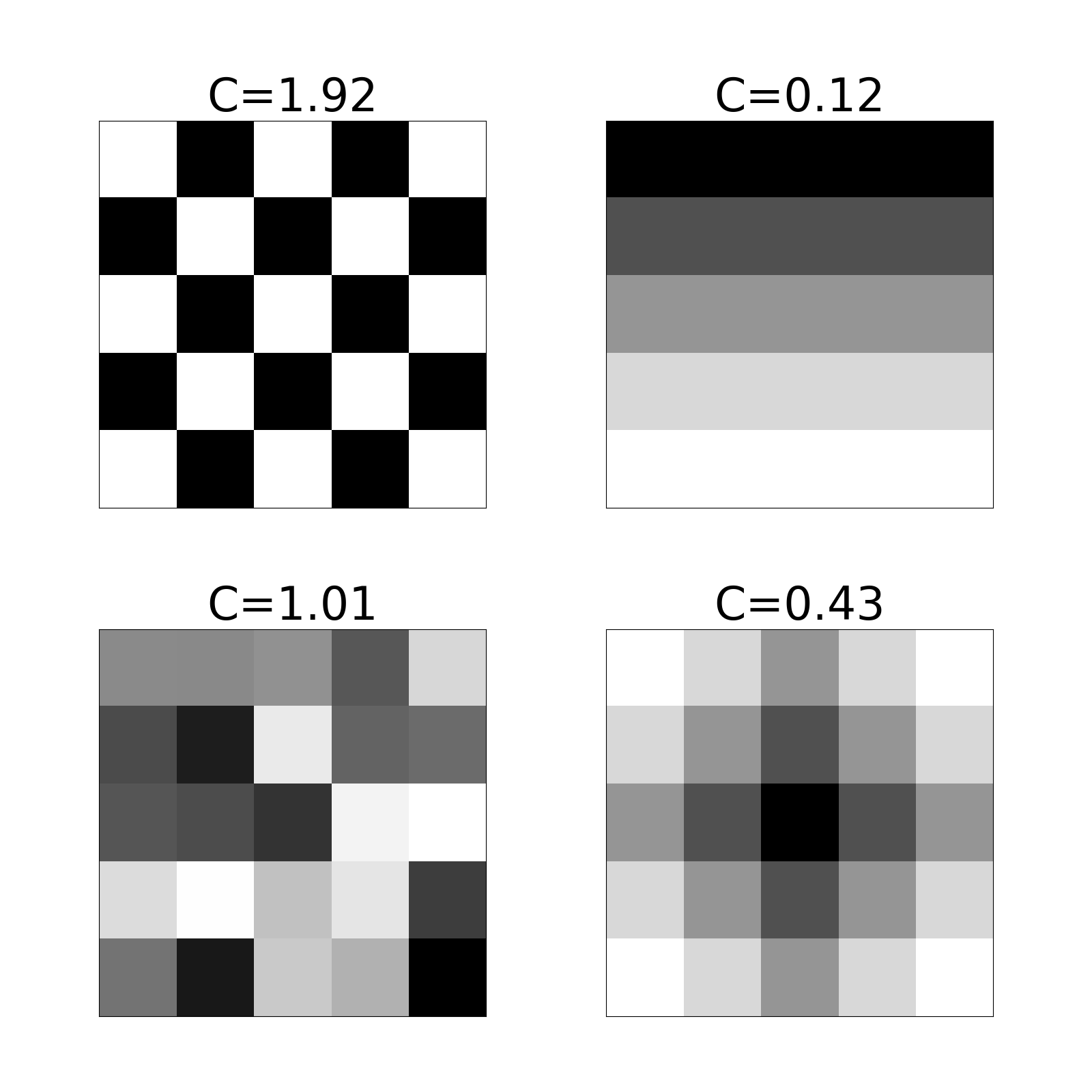
Geary's C statistic computed for different spatial patterns. Using 'rook' neighbors for each grid cell, setting $w_{ij}=1$ for neighbours $j$ of $i$ and then row normalizing the weight matrix. Top left shows gives $C>1$ indicating anti-correlation. Top right shows a spatial gradient giving $C<1$ indicating correlation. Bottom left shows random data giving a value of $C\sim1$ indicating no correlation. Bottom right shows a spreading pattern with positive autocorrelation.

The value of Geary's C lies between 0 and some unspecified value greater than 1. Values significantly lower than 1 demonstrate increasing positive spatial autocorrelation, whilst values significantly higher than 1 illustrate increasing negative spatial autocorrelation.

Geary's C is inversely related to Moran's I, but it is not identical. While Moran's I and Geary's C are both measures of global spatial autocorrelation, they are slightly different. Geary's C uses the sum of squared distances whereas Moran's I uses standardized spatial covariance. By using squared distances Geary's C is less sensitive to linear associations and may pickup autocorrelation where Moran's I may not.

Geary's C is also known as Geary's contiguity ratio or simply Geary's ratio.

== Local Geary's C ==
Like Moran's I, Geary's C can be decomposed into a sum of Local Indicators of Spatial Association (LISA) statistics. LISA statistics can be used to find local clusters through significance testing, though because a large number of tests must be performed (one per sampling area) this approach suffers from the multiple comparisons problem. As noted by Anselin, this means the analysis of the local Geary statistic is aimed at identifying interesting points which should then be subject to further investigation. This is therefore a type of exploratory data analysis.

A local version of $C$ is given by

$$c_i = \frac{1}{m_2}\sum_j w_{ij}(x_i-x_j)^2$$

where

$$m_2= \frac{\sum_i (x_i-\bar x)^2 }{N-1}$$

then,

$$C = \sum_i \frac{c_i}{2S_0}$$

Local Geary's C can be calculated in GeoDa and PySAL.
