= Zephyr Foundation =

American nonprofit organization

The Zephyr Foundation is an American nonprofit organization that supports travel analysis for transportation planning and land-use planning. Its work includes transportation modeling tools, shared data standards, and technical resources for researchers and practitioners.

== History ==
The foundation grew out of efforts to improve travel forecasting led by Joan Walker through the Transportation Research Board's travel forecasting committee. The foundation was established in 2017 by transportation modelers from metropolitan planning organizations, consulting firms, and academia. It was incorporated in Virginia on August 10, 2017. Its first board meeting took place at Northwestern University in November that year.

== Modeling and technical resources ==
Zephyr helped develop and promote the General Modeling Network Specification (GMNS), an open format for sharing road network data between transportation models. The specification grew out of Zephyr's network standards initiative and work by the Federal Highway Administration and the Volpe Center on network management. The first public release of GMNS was in January 2020.

The foundation continued development of Fast-Trips, a tool that simulates passenger travel on public transit, after an agency-led development project ran from 2015 to 2018. On July 1, 2025, it became the administrative agent for ActivitySim, replacing the Association of Metropolitan Planning Organizations Research Foundation. ActivitySim is open-source software for activity-based travel modeling, guided by a consortium of public agencies.

The foundation proposed a working group to support GTFS-ride, a standard for transit ridership data. Zephyr maintains the Travel Model Improvement Program's community mailing list, discussion archive, and library of webinars and technical resources.

== Conferences and awards ==
The foundation sponsors Modeling Mobility (MoMo), a conference organized by volunteers from transportation agencies, consulting firms, vendors, and universities. Zephyr's awards include the Rising Star Award for people early in their careers and the Exceptional Technical Achievement Award. Past awards have gone to the street network modeling software OSMnx and the transportation modeling software AequilibraE.
