= Roy C. Geary =

Irish statistician, founder of the CSO and the ESRI

- Born: Robert Charles Geary; April 11, 1896; Dublin, Ireland
- Died: February 8, 1983 (aged 86); Dublin, Ireland
- Education: University College Dublin; Sorbonne University
- Known for: Geary's C Stone–Geary utility function
- Scientific career
- Workplaces: University of Southampton; Department of Industry and Commerce; ESRI

Robert (Roy) Charles Geary (April 11, 1896 – February 8, 1983) was an Irish mathematician, statistician and founder of both the Central Statistics Office and the Economic and Social Research Institute. Geary is known for his contributions to the estimation of errors-in-variables models, Geary's C, the Geary–Khamis dollar, the Stone–Geary utility function, and Geary's theorem, which has that if the sample mean is distributed independently of the sample variance, then the population is distributed normally.

== Education and career ==
Geary was born in Dublin, Ireland and received his secondary education at the O'Connell School. He went on to study mathematics and mathematical physics at the University College Dublin, where he obtained his B.Sc. and M.Sc. degrees in 1916 and 1918, respectively. He was awarded a scholarship to continue his study at the Sorbonne in Paris, where he attended lectures by Émile Borel, Élie Cartan, Édouard Goursat, Henri Lebesgue, and Paul Langevin. Geary returned to Ireland in 1921, and was offered a lecturer position in mathematics at the University of Southampton (1922–23) and in applied economics at Cambridge University (1946–47). He was a statistician in the Department of Industry and Commerce between 1923 and 1957. The National University of Ireland conferred a Doctorate of Science on him in 1938.

Geary was the founding director of the Central Statistics Office (Ireland) (in 1949). He was head of the National Accounts Branch of the United Nations in New York from 1957 to 1960. He was the founding director of the Economic and Social Research Institute (ESRI) in 1960 where he stayed till his retirement in 1966. He was an honorary fellow of the American Statistical Association and the Institute of Mathematical Statistics. In 1981, he won the Boyle Medal. To honour his contributions to social sciences, the UCD Geary Institute for Public Policy was named after him in 2005.

== Works ==
- Europe's Future in Figures, North Holland (1962), ASIN: B002RB858E
- Elements of Linear Programming with Economic Applications (with J. E. Spencer), Lubrecht & Cramer Ltd (June 1973), ISBN 0317561367
- Exercises in Mathematical Economics and Econometrics, with Outlines of Theory (with J. E. Spencer), London: Charles Griffin & Co (1987), ISBN 0852642261

== External sources ==
- "Robert Charles Geary, 1896–1983". Journal of the Royal Statistical Society. Series A (General). 148 (2): 162. 1985. JSTOR 2981948.
