= Friction of distance =

Principle of geographic thought

Friction of distance is a core principle of geography that states that movement incurs some form of cost, in the form of physical effort, energy, time, and/or the expenditure of other resources, and that these costs are proportional to the distance traveled. This cost is thus a resistance against movement, analogous (but not directly related) to the effect of friction against movement in classical mechanics. The subsequent preference for minimizing distance and its cost underlies a vast array of geographic patterns from economic agglomeration to wildlife migration, as well as many of the theories and techniques of spatial analysis, such as Tobler's first law of geography, network routing, and cost distance analysis. To a large degree, friction of distance is the primary reason why geography is relevant to many aspects of the world, although its importance (and perhaps the importance of geography) has been decreasing with the development of transportation and communication technologies.

== History ==
It is not known who first coined the term "friction of distance," but the effect of distance-based costs on geographic activity and geographic patterns has been a core element of academic geography since its initial rise in the 19th Century. von Thünen's isolated state model of exurban land use (1826), possibly the earliest geographic theory, directly incorporated the cost of transportation of different agricultural products as one of the determinants for how far from a town each type of goods could be produced profitably. The industrial location theory of Alfred Weber (1909) and the central place theory of Walter Christaller (1933) were also basically optimizations of space to minimize travel costs.

By the 1920s, social scientists began to incorporate principles of physics (more precisely, some of its mathematical formalizations), such as gravity, specifically the inverse square law found in Newton's law of universal gravitation. Geographers quickly identified a number of situations in which the interaction between places, whether migration between cities or the distribution of residences willing to patronize a shop, exhibited this distance decay due to the advantages of minimizing distance traveled. Gravity models and other Distance optimization models became widespread during the quantitative revolution of the 1950s and the subsequent rise of spatial analysis. Gerald Carrothers (1956) was one of the first to explicitly use the analogy of "friction" to conceptualize the effect of distance, suggesting that these distance optimizations needed to acknowledge that the effect varies according to localized factors. Ian McHarg, as published in Design with Nature (1969), was among those who developed the multifaceted nature of distance costs, although he did not initially employ mathematical or computational methods to optimize them.

In the era of geographic information systems, starting in the 1970s, many of the existing proximity models and new algorithms were automated as analysis tools, making them significantly easier to use by a wider set of professionals. These tools have tended to focus on problems that could be solved deterministically, such as buffers, Cost distance analysis, interpolation and network routing. Other problems that apply the friction of distance are much more difficult (i.e., NP-hard), such as the traveling salesman problem and cluster analysis, and automated tools to solve them (usually using heuristic algorithms such as k-means clustering) are less widely available, or only recently available, in GIS software.

== Distance Costs ==
As an illustration, picture a hiker standing on the side of an isolated wooded mountain, who wishes to travel to the other side of the mountain. There are essentially an infinite number of paths she could take to get there. Traveling directly over the mountain peak is "expensive," in that every ten meters spent climbing requires significant effort. Traveling ten meters cross country through the woods requires significantly more time and effort than traveling ten meters along a developed trail or through open meadow. Taking a level route along a road going around the mountain has a much lower cost (in both effort and time) for every ten meters, but the total cost accumulates over a much longer distance. In each case, the amount of time and/or effort required to travel ten meters is a measurement of the friction of distance. Determining the optimal route requires balancing these costs, and can be solved using the technique of cost distance analysis.

In another, very common example, a person wants to drive from his home to the nearest hospital. Of the many (but finite) possible routes through the road network, the one with the shortest distance passes through residential neighborhoods with low speed limits and frequent stops. An alternative route follows a bypass highway around the neighborhoods, having a significantly longer distance, with much higher speed limits and infrequent stops. Thus, this alternative has a much lower unit friction of distance (in this case, time), but it accumulates over a greater distance, requiring calculations to determine the optimal (taking the least total travel time), perhaps using the network analysis algorithms commonly found in web maps such as Google Maps.

The costs that are proportional to distance can take a number of forms, each of which may or may not be relevant in a given geographic situation:

- Travel cost, the resources required to move through space. This is most commonly time, energy, or fuel consumption, but may also include more subjective costs such as nuisance.
- Traffic cost, the impedance resulting from the aggregate volume of travelers exceeding the optimum capacity of the space (usually a linear network in this case).
- Construction cost, the resources required to build the infrastructure that makes travel through the space possible, such as roads, pipes, and cables.
- Environmental impacts, the negative effects on the natural or human environment caused by the infrastructure or the travel along it. For example, one would want to minimize the length of residential neighborhood or wetland destroyed to build a highway.

Some of these costs are easily quantifiable and measurable, such as transit time, fuel consumption, and construction costs, thus naturally lending themselves to optimization algorithms. That said, there may be a significant amount of uncertainty in predicting them due to variability over time (e.g., travel time through a road network depending on changing traffic volume) or variability in individual situations (e.g., how fast a person wishes to drive). Other costs are much more difficult to measure due to their qualitative or subjective nature, such as political protest or ecological impact; these typically require the creation of "pseudo-measures" in the form of indices or scales to operationalize.

All of these costs are fields in that they are spatially intensive (a "density" of cost per unit distance) and vary over space. The cost field (often called a cost surface) may be a continuous, smooth function or may have abrupt changes. This variability of cost occurs both in unconstrained (two- or three-dimensional) space, as well as in constrained networks, such as roads and cable telecommunications.

== Applications ==
A large number of geographic theories, spatial analysis techniques, and GIS applications are directly based on the practical effects of friction of distance:

- Tobler's first law of geography, formalized as spatial autocorrelation, states that nearby locations are more likely to similar in many aspects than distant locations, typically being the result of a history of greater interactions between them.
- gravity models, distance decay and other models of spatial interaction are based on the tendency of the volume of interaction between two locations to decrease as the distance between them increases due to the friction of distance, often in a pattern that is analogous (mathematically, not physically) to the Inverse-square law of many of the properties in Physics, such as illuminance and gravity.
- Economic agglomeration is the tendency of institutions that frequently interact with each other to move close together in physical space, such as the concentration of business services (advertising, finance, etc.) in large cities to be near corporate headquarters.
- Location theory includes a number of theories and techniques for determining the optimal location to site a particular activity, based on minimizing travel costs. Notable examples include the classical early 20th Century theories of Johann Heinrich von Thünen, Walter Christaller, and Alfred Weber, and GIS-era algorithms for Location-allocation.
- Network analysis includes a number of problems and techniques for modeling travel constrained to a linear network or graph, such as roads, public utilities, or streams. Many of these are optimization problems to minimize travel cost, such as the ubiquitous Dijkstra's algorithm to find the minimal cost path between two locations.
- Cost distance analysis, a series of algorithms for finding minimal-cost paths through an unconstrained space in which cost varies as a field.
- Migration of humans and animals is often seen as the result of balancing the advantages of remaining stationary (due to the friction of distance) with "push/pull" factors that encourage one to leave one location or to move to another location.
- Spatial diffusion is the gradual spread of culture, ideas, and institutions across space over time, in which the desirability of one place adopting the traits of a separate place overcome the friction of distance.
- Time geography explores how human activity is affected by the constraints of movement, especially temporal costs.

== Time-space Convergence ==
Historically, the friction of distance was very high for most types of movement, making long-distance movement and interaction relatively slow and rare (but not non-existent). The result was a strongly localized human geography, manifested in aspects as varied as language and economy. One of the most profound effects of the technological advances since 1800, including the railroad, the automobile, and the telephone, has been to drastically reduce the costs of moving people, goods, and information over long distances. This led to widespread diffusion and integration, ultimately resulting in many of the aspects of globalization. The geographic effect of this diminishing friction of distance is called time-space convergence or cost-space convergence.

Of these technologies, telecommunications, especially the Internet, has perhaps had the most profound effect. Although there are still distance-based costs of transmitting information, such as the laying of cable and the generation of electromagnetic signal energy (traditionally manifesting in ways such as long-distance telephone charges), these are now so small for any meaningful unit of information that they are no longer managed in a distance-based form, but are bundled into fixed (not based on distance) service costs. For example, some portion of the fee for mobile telephone service covers the higher costs of long-distance service, but the customer does not see it, and thus does not make communication decisions based on distance. The rise of free shipping has similar causes and effects on retail trade.

It has been argued that the virtual elimination of the friction of distance in many aspects of society has resulted in the "death of Geography," in which relative location is no longer relevant to many tasks in which it formerly played a crucial role. It is now possible to conduct many interactions over global distances almost as easily as over local distances, including retail trade, business-to-business services, and some types of remote work. Thus, these services could be theoretically provided from anywhere with equal cost. The COVID-19 pandemic has tested and accelerated many of these trends.

Conversely, others have seen a strengthening in the geographic effects of other aspects of life, or perhaps the increasing focus on them as traditional distance-based aspects have become less relevant. This includes the lifestyle amenities of a place, such as local natural landscapes or urban nightlife that must be experienced in person (thus requiring physical travel and thus entailing the friction of distance). Also, many people prefer in-person interactions that could technically be conducted remotely, such as business meetings, education, tourism, and shopping, which should make distance-based effects relevant for the foreseeable future. The contrasting trends of "frictional" and "frictionless" factors have necessitated a more nuanced analysis of geography than the traditional blanket statements of location always mattering, or the recent claims that location does not matter at all.
