= Trams in Dessau =

Tram system in Dessau, Germany

Coordinates: 51°50′23″N 12°14′13″E

Dessau tramway network
- Straßenbahn Dessau
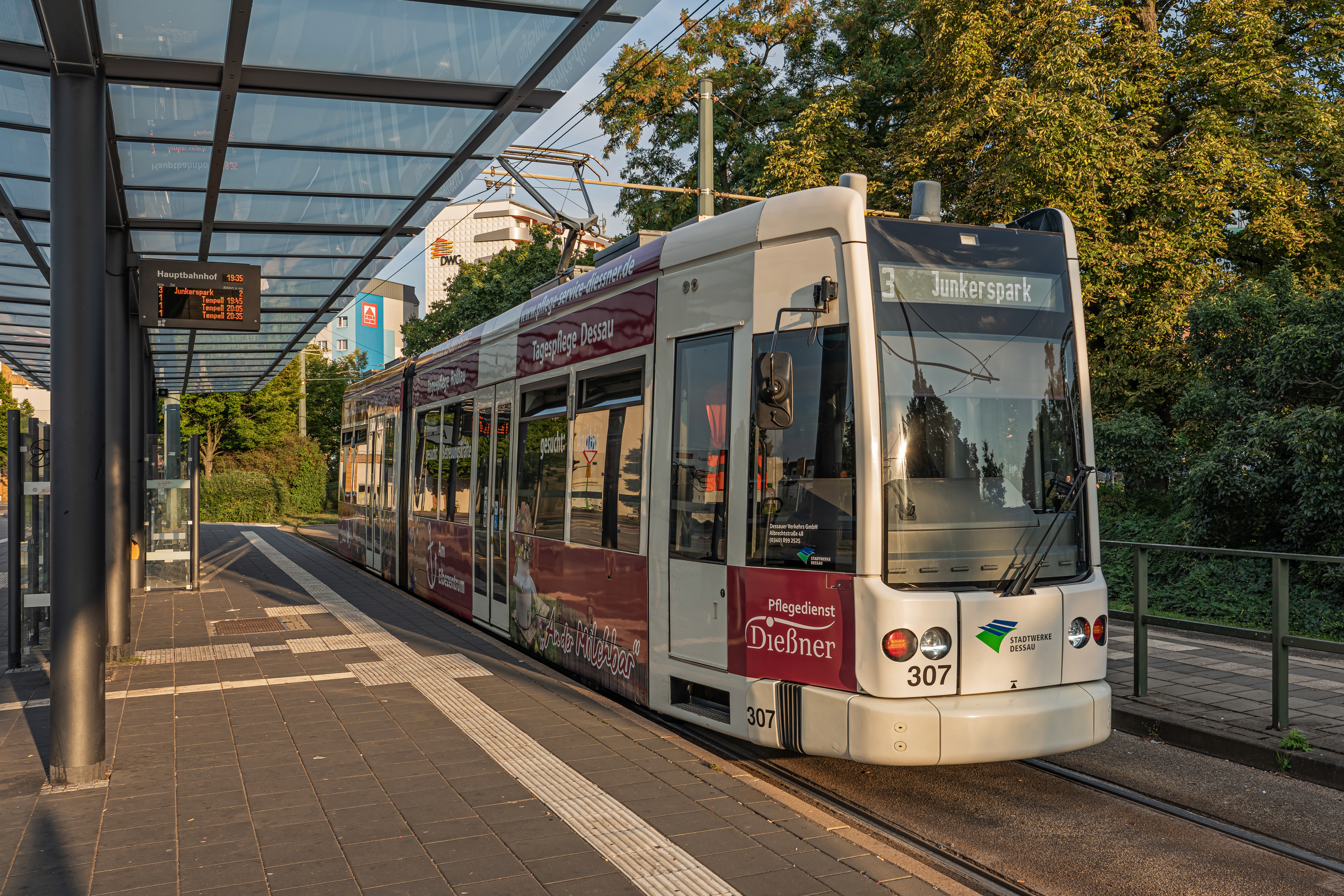
- NGT low-floor tram at main station, 2022

Operation
- Locale: Dessau-Roßlau, Saxony-Anhalt, Germany

Statistics
Gas tram era: 1894–1901
- Status: Converted to electricity
- Track gauge: 1,435 mm (4 ft 8 1/2 in)
- Propulsion system: Gas
Electric tram era: since 1901
- Status: Operational
- Lines: 2
- Operator: Dessauer Verkehrsgesellschaft
- Track gauge: 1,435 mm (4 ft 8 1/2 in)
- Propulsion system: Electricity
- Electrification: 750 V DC
- Stock: 10 NGT6DE
- Route length: 11.9 km (7.4 mi)
- Stops: 29
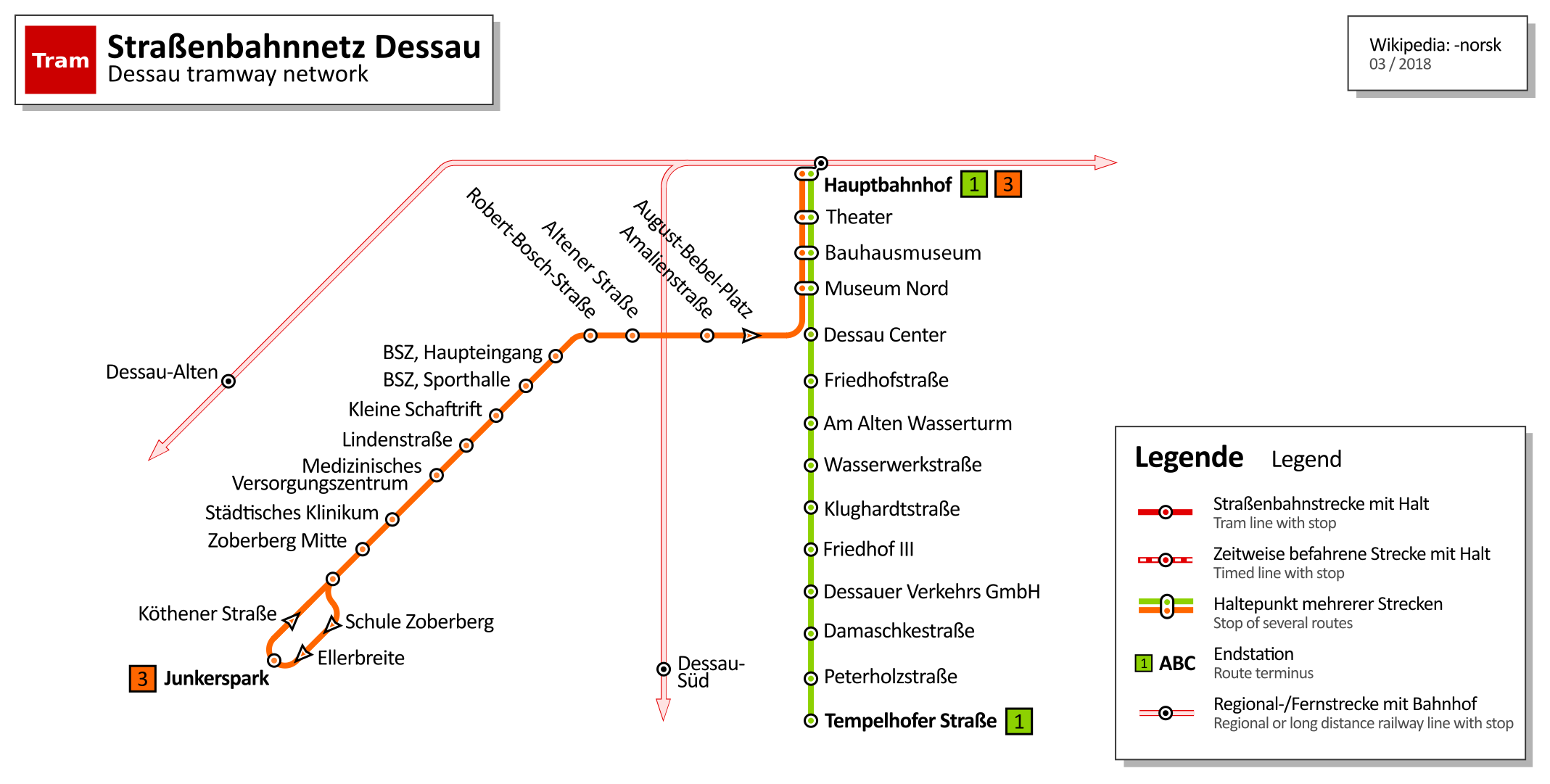
- Website: Dessauer Verkehrsgesellschaft (in German)

The Dessau tramway (German: Straßenbahn Dessau) is a network of tramways forming part of the public transport system in Dessau-Roßlau, a city in Saxony-Anhalt, Germany.

The first part of the network opened in 1894 as a gas-powered tram line, and electric operation began on 26 March 1901. Since 1990 the network has been operated by Dessauer Verkehrsgesellschaft.

== Lines ==
Since 2016 only two lines have been in operation, lines 1 and 3.

Line	Route	Stops	Journey time (peak hours)
1	Hauptbahnhof – Wasserwerkstraße – Dessau Süd	14	16 min
3	Hauptbahnhof – Berufsschulzentrum – Junkerspark	19	22 min

== Rolling Stock ==
=== GT8 ===
At the time of German reunification the tram fleet in Dessau still consisted of two-axle vehicles which required urgent replacement. To renew the fleet 14 second-hand Düwag GT8 trams were acquired from Duisburg in 1992. Four of these were sold again to Norrköping in 1997, with the remaining ten covering all services in Dessau until the arrival of new low-floor trams in 2001. As of 2020 two GT8 trams were still in use as service vehicles.

=== NGT6DE ===
The current rolling stock fleet consists of ten Flexity Classic NGT6DE unidirectional low-floor trams, numbered 301-310. These trams were delivered between 2001 and 2002 and have six-axles, two articulated sections and a length of 21 m. The trams were built by Bombardier Transportation in Bautzen, with the front and back sections produced by Fahrzeugtechnik Dessau.

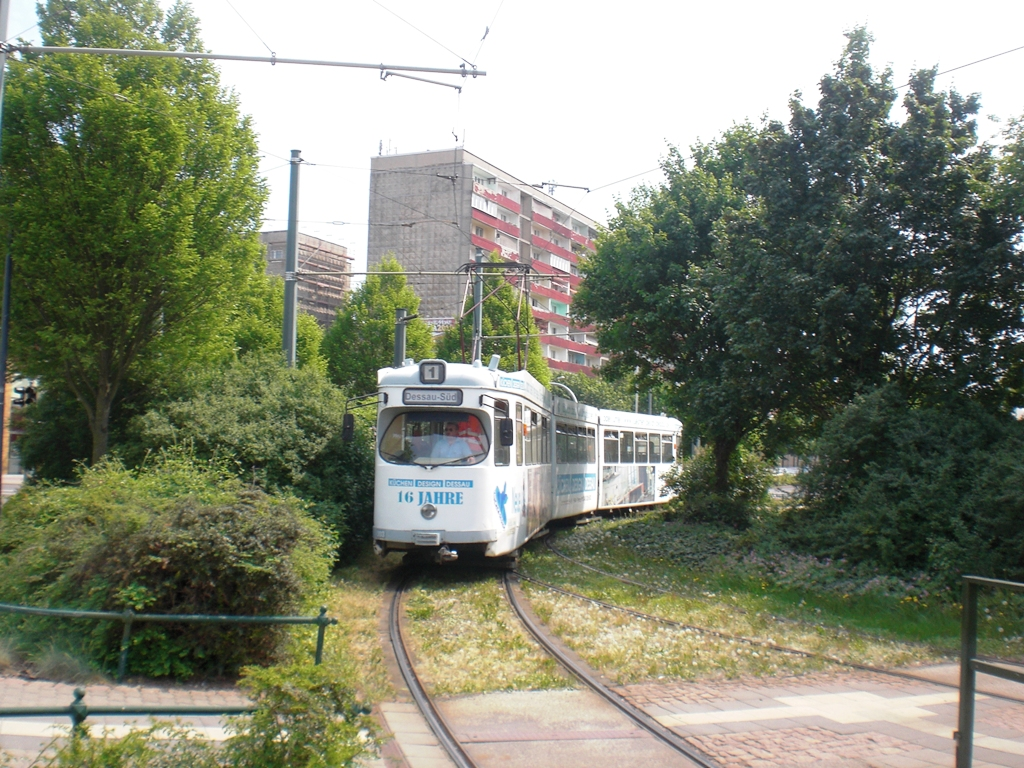
Düwag GT8 approaching Dessau Hauptbahnhof

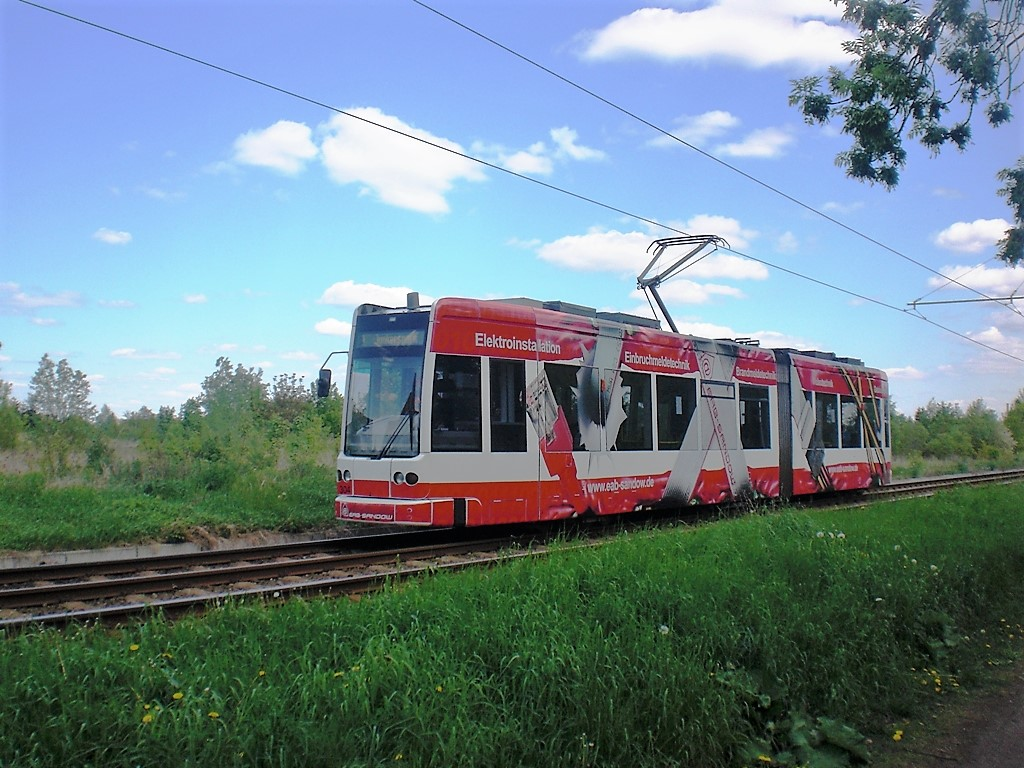
Flexity Classic NGT6DE

== See also ==
- List of town tramway systems in Germany
- Trams in Germany

== Bibliography ==
- Bauer, Gerhard; Kuschinski, Norbert (1994). Die Straßenbahnen in Ostdeutschland [The Tramways in East Germany]. Vol. Band 2: Sachsen-Anhalt, Thüringen [Volume 2: Saxony-Anhalt, Thuringia]. Aachen, Germany: Schweers + Wall. ISBN 392167980X.
- Schwandl, Robert (2012). Schwandl's Tram Atlas Deutschland (in German and English) (3rd ed.). Berlin: Robert Schwandl Verlag. ISBN 9783936573336.
