= Walmart+ =

Paid subscription service offered by Walmart

- Website type: Subscription service
- Founded: September 15, 2020; 6 years ago
- Headquarters: Bentonville, Arkansas, US
- Area served: United States; Canada
- Owner: Walmart
- Industry: Internet
- Website: www.walmart.com/plus
- Registration: Required
- Current status: Active

Walmart+ is a paid subscription service and loyalty program of Walmart that gives users access to additional services otherwise unavailable or available at a premium to other customers.

Launched on September 15, 2020, the service primarily provides benefits such as free shipping on items purchased via Walmart's online store, free same day delivery for qualifying grocery and pharmacy orders from local Walmart stores, reward points ("Walmart Cash") on eligible Walmart and travel purchases, and early access to major sales. The service has also included benefits tied to third-party companies and services, including fuel discounts at Walmart, ExxonMobil, and Murphy USA gas stations, and bundled access to the ad-supported tier of either Paramount+ or Peacock.

Walmart+ is positioned as a competitor to services such as Amazon Prime, Instacart, and competing delivery services offered by other grocery chains.

== History and demographics ==
Walmart+ was launched on September 15, 2020 during the COVID-19 pandemic. Walmart has never shared the total number of subscribers since launching the service. In September 2021, Deutsche Bank estimated that 32 million US households held a Walmart+ subscription after reaching an inflection point of growth. Morgan Stanley estimated the number of subscribers to be 16 million in August 2022, and between 17.2 million and 26.5 million in January 2025.

In September 2021, 86% of Walmart+ subscribers also had Amazon Prime subscriptions. Walmart+ and Amazon Prime have similar demographics. In 2021, 61% of Walmart+ subscribers had annual household incomes of $50,000 or more, and 33% earned $100,000 or more annually, compared with 63% and 28% for Prime members, respectively. In February 2024, a Prosper Insights & Analytics survey showed that 60% Walmart+ members were between 18–44 years old, compared to 50% of Amazon Prime members and 46.2% of the US population. In the same survey, 39.8% of Walmart+ households had four or more persons, compared to 32.3% for Amazon.

According to a February 2024 consumer survey, 52.9% of Walmart+ consumers were either confident or very confident in the state of the American economy, compared to 41.6% for Amazon Prime members and 37.6% for Walmart in-store shoppers. Walmart+ shoppers had the highest consumer confidence among shoppers at the top ten retailers on the National Retail Federation's Top 2023 retailers list. Annual subscribers to Walmart+ save an average of $300 per year.

Walmart+ launched in Canada in June 2026 as a rebranding of its Delivery Pass program, offering free same day delivery and free shipping with no order minimum. The service also includes access to the "Standard with ads" tier of Bell Media's streaming platform Crave.

== Benefits ==
Walmart+ members can receive the following benefits:

- Free shipping on items sold and/or shipped from Walmart.com.
- Free same day delivery on groceries and pharmacy prescriptions from Walmart stores on qualifying orders of $35 or more. (Note: The $35 minimum for free shipping only applies to items delivered from a local Walmart store. Items that are shipped from Walmart.com have no minimum purchase amount to qualify for free unlimited shipping.)
- Free product returns from home at eligible locations, without any need for packaging or leaving one's house.
- Fuel discounts of 10 cents per gallon of gasoline at Walmart, ExxonMobil, and Murphy USA gas stations. (Note: Alaska and Oklahoma residents can only save five cents per gallon, rather than ten cents.)
- Free flat tire repair and free road hazard warranty at Walmart Auto Centers.
- Benefits with Verizon and American Express.
- Subscribers may receive either a Paramount+ Essential or Peacock Premium subscription at no additional charge; Walmart+ members can switch between a Paramount+ or Peacock subscription every 90 days.
- Mobile scan and go, a feature where in-store Walmart shoppers can scan items as they shop through the store to save time, before finalizing their payment at a self-checkout register.
- Early access to the Walmart sales, like Black Friday deals.
- Walmart Rewards, a benefit where members earn Walmart Cash on eligible purchases, that can be redeemed on future purchases.
- Walmart+ Travel, a benefit where members earn up to 5% Walmart Cash on hotel reservations, vacation bookings, car rentals, and tours and 2% on air travel.
- 5% unlimited cashback on Walmart purchases through the OnePay CashRewards credit card.
- Free access to a Sams Club Plus membership

New benefits have been added to the service since its launch. In August 2022, Walmart announced that it would partner with the streaming service Paramount+ to bundle its ad-supported tier as a benefit for Walmart+ subscribers. In May 2024, following a pilot in 2023, Walmart announced that Walmart+ would include access to the veterinary telehealth service Pawp. In August 2024, Walmart announced a partnership with Burger King, under which Walmart+ subscribers can link their account to Burger King's Royal Perks program to receive a daily 25% discount on online orders, and a free Whopper with any purchase once every three months.

In September 2025, Walmart announced a similar streaming partnership with Peacock, which is available as an option alongside Paramount+ for subscribers.

== Pricing ==
Walmart+ costs $98 per year or $12.95 per month, with applicable tax. The subscription price has never changed since the service's launch. College and graduate students and recipients of SNAP, WIC, Medicaid, and other qualifying government aid can purchase Walmart+ Assist, which costs $49 annually or $6.47 monthly, which is 50% off the regular membership price. Walmart+ has a 30-day free trial period.

For $138 annually or $19.95 monthly, subscribers can get Walmart InHome, a delivery service where vetted, insured, and safety-trained Walmart employees put groceries away on their doorsteps, or in their garages, kitchens, or fridges, as instructed. Subscribers must have a compatible lock or garage door opener or purchase installation of one for $49.95, in order to provide Walmart employees one-time access for each delivery into their homes. Employees must wear shoe covers, masks, and fully lit body cameras during their deliveries. A Walmart InHome subscription comes with all the other benefits included in a standard Walmart+ subscription.
