= Tramway of the city of Berlin =

Tram company in Berlin, 1900 to 1920

The tramway of the city of Berlin (SSB), also known as Städtische Straßenbahnen in Berlin, was the first municipal tram company within the boundaries of Berlin at the time. In order to counter the monopoly position of the private company Große Berliner Straßenbahn (GBS), the Berlin City Council decided in October 1900 to operate streetcars on its own account in future. The first lines went into operation on July 1, 1908 and were then rapidly expanded. On December 1, 1910, the municipal streetcars took over operation on the so-called Flachbahn, which had previously been operated by the Hochbahngesellschaft. The expansion of the network was provisionally completed with the opening of the Lindentunnel in December 1916. After the formation of the unified municipality of Greater Berlin, the municipal streetcars and the Berlin Electric Trams were merged with the Große Berliner Straßenbahn to form the Berliner Straßenbahn on December 13, 1920. At this time, the SSB had a route length of 31.2 kilometres (19.4 mi) and had a total of 193 cars (115 motor cars and 78 sidecars) in its fleet.

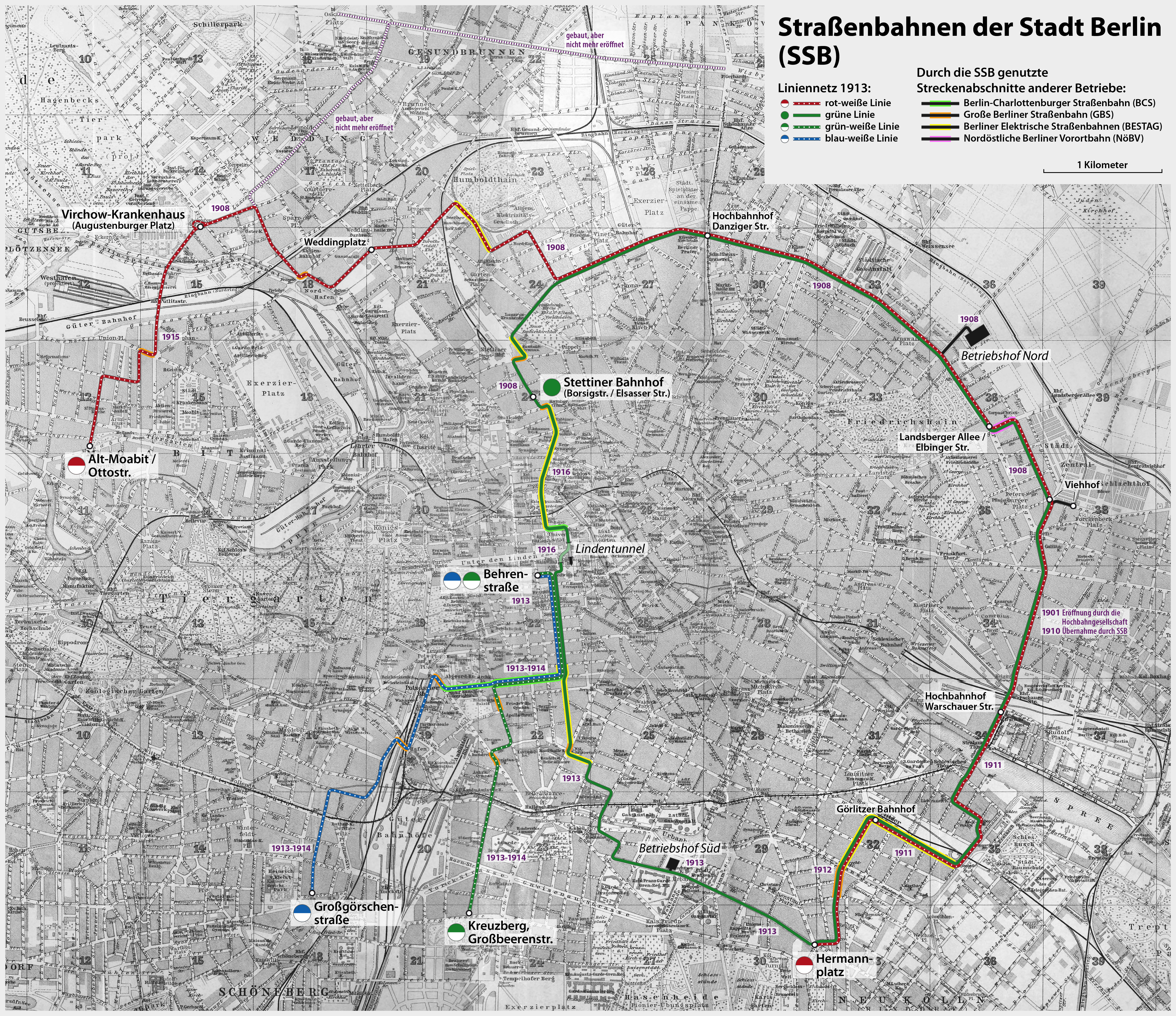
Network development of the municipal streetcars

== History ==
=== Previous history ===
At the beginning of the 1890s, there were three horse-drawn railway companies in Berlin: the Berliner Pferde-Eisenbahn (BPfE; from 1894 as Berlin-Charlottenburger Straßenbahn, BCS), the Große Berliner Pferde-Eisenbahn (GBPfE) and the Neue Berliner Pferdebahn (NBPf). Of these companies, the GBPfE was by far the largest, providing around 60 percent of transportation services in Berlin in 1890 (including the city and ring railroad and horse-drawn buses). In 1894 it expanded its position by taking over the management of the NBPf. In the following year, Siemens & Halske opened the first electric streetcar line within the boundaries of Berlin at that time with the electric streetcars in Berlin (from 1899 as Berliner Elektrische Straßenbahnen AG, BESTAG). GBPfE, which initially shied away from the high costs of network electrification, followed suit in 1896 and opened its first electric lines on the occasion of the Berlin Trade Exhibition in Treptower Park. After the company realized that the advantages outweighed those of horse-drawn operation, On July 2, 1897, and January 19, 1898, GBPfE and NBPf on the one hand and the City of Berlin on the other concluded a new consent agreement. The key point of this paper, known as the "conversion agreement", was the electrification of the horse-drawn railway network. The city prohibited the hanging of overhead lines at representative locations, and the carriages were to bridge the relevant sections using accumulators. The company was permitted to operate streetcars until December 31, 1919. On January 25, 1898, the general meeting of the GBPfE changed its name to Große Berliner Straßenbahn A.-G. (GBS).

An earlier version of the conversion agreement included several new lines in the GBS network as a construction obligation. The Social Democrats in the Berlin City Council expressed reservations about this, as they feared that GBS would be strengthened. The city therefore put these routes out to tender separately, whereupon offers were received from GBS and Continentale Gesellschaft für elektrische Unternehmungen. The city hoped that negotiations with the latter would result in lasting competition between two transport companies and favorable transport development. However, the Continentale Gesellschaft refused to give a permanent guarantee of independence from the GBS. Instead, the city councillors learned that the company was already in merger negotiations with the companies behind GBS.

On the advice of the negotiating commission, the municipal transport department then considered building and operating its own lines. It was also hoped that this would provide sufficient experience in the tramway sector, as there was an option to acquire GBS after the consent agreement expired in 1919. The decision taken was confirmed shortly afterwards by two important measures:

1. On May 4, 1900, on the instructions of the Prussian Minister of Public Works, the Berlin Police Commissioner granted GBS the concession to operate streetcars until December 31, 1949. The city only learned of this process from the press and felt that it had been ignored by the state authorities. As the approval contract had already expired in 1919, the lack of clarity led to a series of lawsuits between the company and the city, which worsened the relationship between them.
2. After the harsh winter of 1898/1899, the city, police headquarters and GBS agreed to shorten the sections of the line used in accumulator operation. At the request of the GBS, the Chief of Police then ordered the complete discontinuation of accumulator operation on September 26, 1900. Although the city recognized the necessity, it felt once again ignored by the state authorities.

On October 18, 1900, at the request of the Magistrat, the city council passed the resolution to build a municipal streetcar network by 113:9 votes.

=== Network planning and opening ===
The resolutions passed by the Transport Department initially provided for the establishment of three routes:

- Zoologischer Garten – Landwehrkanal – Mariannenstraße – Manteuffelstraße – Manteuffelbrücke (planned) – Küstriner Platz – Landsberger Tor
- Landwehrkanal – Alexandrinenstraße – Dresdener Straße
- Seestraße – Torfstraße – Heidestraße – Reichstagufer – Eiserne Brücke

At the suggestion of the Chief Constable, four further routes were included in the plans:

- Potsdamer Straße Corner of Winterfeldtstraße – Hafenplatz – Dönhoffplatz
- Neustädtische Kirchstraße – Dönhoffplatz (crossing of the street Unter den Linden)
- Stettiner Bahnhof – Bernauer Straße – Danziger Straße – Petersburger Straße – Warschauer Brücke
- Weddingplatz – Voltastraße – Wattstraße – Bernauer Straße

The deputation submitted these plans for an expanded network to the police president for state approval. In consultation with the Königliche Eisenbahndirektion Berlin expressed reservations about the inner-city lines, as the affected streets could not accommodate any further traffic. Only the northern lines from Stettiner Bahnhof or Weddingplatz to Warschauer Brücke were certified as feasible. The crossing of Unter den Linden had previously been rejected by the German Emperor and Prussian King Wilhelm II in April 1901. As the remaining lines were not expected to be of sufficient benefit, the city extended the network planning by a further three lines:

- Großgörschenstraße – Dönhoffplatz
- Kreuzberg – Dönhoffplatz
- Hermannplatz – Dönhoffplatz

After approval by the magistrate, the project was resubmitted to the Chief of Police. He prohibited the use of the Augustabrücke bridge over the Landwehr Canal, so that the Großgörschenstraße – Dönhoffplatz line had to be postponed. The city was also refused permission to lay tracks in Petersburger Straße. Shared use of the GBS tracks failed as the latter made excessive financial demands. The terminus of this line was therefore initially at Elbinger Straße. There were further changes in Friedrichstadt, where the GBS successfully intervened against the track construction in Friedrichstraße and the end point of the line coming from Kreuzberg was moved to Behrenstraße.

On the basis of the revised design, the city was granted planning permission by royal cabinet order on October 24, 1906. With regard to the inner-city terminus stations in Krausenstraße (Dönhoffplatz) and Behrenstraße, the city was obliged to relocate them if the supervisory authority – the Royal Railway Directorate of Berlin – deemed it necessary. As the tracks of GBS and its subsidiaries had to be used in this area, but no agreement had yet been reached, the city initially concentrated on building the northern lines from Weddingplatz or Stettiner Bahnhof to Landsberger Allee, on the corner of Elbinger Straße. The police commissioner issued the permit on January 10, 1907, and the city approved the necessary funding a month later. Meanwhile, plans for an extension of these lines were maturing. For the extension to the south, an agreement was reached with Neue Berliner Straßenbahnen Nordost A.-G. to use their tracks in Landsberger Allee. In the further course, the line was to run through Ebertystraße and thus parallel to Petersburger Straße to the Zentralviehhof. The permit was received on October 31, 1907, and the city approved the necessary funds on December 12, 1907. Construction work on the line began in November of the same year.

Line overview August 29, 1908
Line/ Signal board	Course	Length (in km)
Rot/Weiß	Virchow-Krankenhaus (Augustenburger Platz) – Triftstraße – Tegeler Straße – Fennstraße – Am Nordhafen – Sellerstraße – Schulzendorfer Straße – Grenzstraße – Hussitenstraße – Voltastraße – Wattstraße – Strelitzer Straße – Bernauer Straße – – Danziger Straße – Elbinger Straße – Landsberger Allee – Viehhof (Ebertystraße Ecke Thaerstraße)	9,5
Grün	Stettiner Bahnhof (Borsigstraße Ecke Elsasser Straße) – Invalidenstraße – Gartenstraße – Bernauer Straße … Viehhof (Ebertystraße Ecke Thaerstraße)	6,6

The work proceeded quickly so that the official acceptance could take place six months later on June 19, 1908. On July 1, the ceremonial opening of the municipal streetcar service took place in the presence of Lord Mayor Martin Kirschner and City Planning Officer Friedrich Krause. The first scheduled train left the depot in Kniprodestraße shortly after midday. The lines were marked with colored signal boards on the front of the vehicles, green for the Stettiner Bahnhof – Landsberger Allee line and red/white for the Weddingplatz – Landsberger Allee line. A few weeks later, the extensions from Weddingplatz to Rudolf-Virchow-Krankenhaus and from Landsberger Allee to Zentralviehhof went into operation. The line length in the first year thus amounted to 10.4 kilometers. The construction costs, including the extensions, amounted to 3,106,465.75 Mark.

=== Expansion to the south ===
Since 1905, the city had been negotiating with the Hochbahngesellschaft to take over the Flachbahn operated by it. This streetcar line ran between Warschauer Brücke and Zentralviehhof in connection with the elevated line and thus played a central role in the expansion of the city's streetcar network to the south. On October 28, 1909, the city council approved funds of 700,000 marks for the acquisition of the line. The takeover and simultaneous extension of the municipal lines took place on January 1, 1910. At the same time, the Hochbahngesellschaft put a new streetcar line between Warschauer Brücke and Lichtenberg into operation. This had previously been contractually guaranteed.

On January 1, 1911, the city opened the extension from Warschauer Brücke to Wiener Straße near Görlitzer Bahnhof. This was followed by negotiations with the then still independent city of Neukölln about an extension of the line to Hermannplatz, which went into operation on December 20, 1912. The line length was now 15.3 kilometers.

Line overview 1st October 1913
Line/ Signal board	Course	Length (in km)
Rot/Weiß	Virchow Hospital (Augustenburger Platz) ... Ebertystraße – Thaerstraße – Baltenplatz – Petersburger Straße – Warschauer Straße – Oberbaumbrücke – Falckensteinstraße – Wrangelstraße – Taborstraße – Görlitzer Ufer – Wiener Straße – Grünauer Straße – Friedelstraße – Weserstraße – Hermannplatz	15,3
Grün	Szczecin railroad station (Borsigstraße corner Elsasser Straße) ... Hermannplatz – Urbanstraße – Tempelherrenstraße – Johanniterstraße – Alexandrinenstraße – Neuenburger Straße – Alte Jakobstraße – Hollmannstraße – Lindenstraße – Markgrafenstraße – Behrenstraße Ecke Charlottenstraße	17,3
Grün/Weiß	Kreuzberg, Großbeerenstraße – Königgrätzer Straße – Hedemannstraße – Wilhelmstraße – Zimmerstraße – Markgrafenstraße – Behrenstraße Ecke Charlottenstraße	3,7
Blau/Weiß	Großgörschenstraße – Steinmetzstraße – Kurfürstenstraße – Dennewitzstraße – Flottwellstraße – Schöneberger Ufer – Köthener Straße – Königgrätzer Straße – Prinz-Albrecht-Straße – Zimmerstraße ... Behrenstraße Ecke Charlottenstraße	4,8

On August 18, 1911, the city and GBS agreed on a new consent contract and thus largely settled their disputes. The city was now able to start building the southern sections of the line. For the line from Großgörschenstraße, however, the construction of the Köthener Brücke provided a new crossing over the Landwehr Canal. Behrenstraße was now planned as the common terminus of the southern lines instead of Dönhoffplatz. Work on the Hermannplatz – Behrenstraße section, which was to be served by the Green Line, began on October 1, 1912, and this section was completed on May 8, 1913, according to other information on May 10, in operation. The lines Kreuzberg – Behrenstraße (signal color green/white) and Großgörschenstraße – Behrenstraße (signal color blue/white, yellow or orange according to other specifications) followed on August 23, 1913, and October 1, 1913. All three lines used shorter sections of the other companies' lines several times (see below). At the end of 1913, the municipal streetcars had 26.7 kilometers of their own lines and a track length of 58.6 kilometers. Trains ran on 11.2 kilometers of track owned by other companies.

The two newest lines had to be discontinued with the outbreak of the World War I on August 2, 1914, as most of the personnel were called up for military service. Although the city planned to extend them northwards, they never went back into operation. On the remaining lines, the timetable had to be thinned out due to staff shortages, despite increasing passenger numbers. As in other companies, the municipal tramway increasingly employed women as conductors and drivers. in 1916, 177 of the 564 employees were female.

=== Ring closure in the center ===
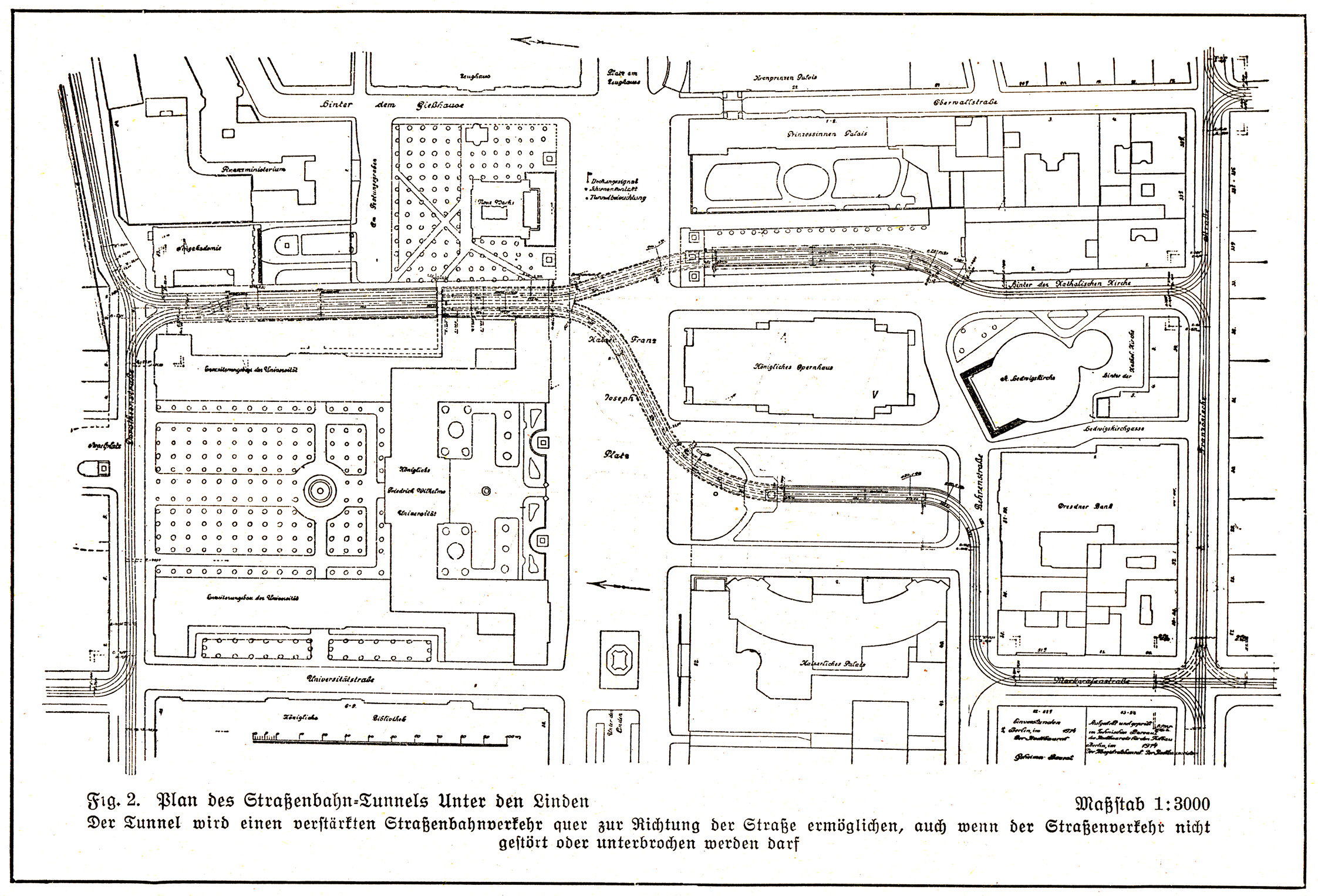
Übersichtskarte des Lindentunnels

The final stops of the green line in Borsigstraße and Behrenstraße were about one and a half kilometers apart as the crow flies. The next project was therefore to connect these two lines to form a ring line. The crossing of the boulevard Unter den Linden was still problematic. Unlike most streets in the city, the "Linden" was under the direct control of the German Emperor and Prussian King, so a crossing was only possible with his express permission. The monarch strictly rejected requests for a further crossing next to the existing route of the GBS at the Opera House. He is said to have responded to one such request with the remark "No, it will be made underground!".

The city and GBS then developed their own tunnel plans independently of each other, with GBS planning further underground routes along the boulevard and Leipziger Straße in addition to the Lindentunnel. The city, on the other hand, planned a four-track streetcar tunnel at the existing Lindenkreuzung intersection. In addition to the city's own lines, this was also to be able to accommodate those of GBS and the municipal BESTAG. Another location for the structure was out of the question, as the necessary ramps could not have been built elsewhere or the necessary land acquisition would have been too expensive. In 1909, the Prussian Minister for Public Works rejected the GBS concept. With the consent agreement of 1911, both sides agreed on the construction of a joint tunnel under the management of the City of Berlin.

Line overview December 17, 1916
Line/ Signal board	Course	Length (in km)
Rot/Weiß	Ottostraße Ecke Alt-Moabit – Oldenburger Straße – Wiclefstraße – Wilhelmshavener Straße – Birkenstraße – Putlitzstraße – Föhrer Straße – Augustenburger Platz ... Hermannplatz	17,6
Grün	„Municipal Ostring“ Szczecin railroad station (Borsigstraße corner Elsasser Straße) ... Behrenstraße – Lindentunnel (Westtunnel) – Dorotheenstraße – Universitätsstraße – Prinz-Friedrich-Karl-Straße – Artilleriestraße – Stettiner Bahnhof	19,8

The tunnel was built between 1914 and 1916. The northern four-track ramp began near Dorotheenstraße at Kastanienwäldchen between Universität and Neuer Wache. At the height of the northern edge of the Linden, the tunnel divided into an east and a west branch. The west tunnel led in a reverse curve to Kaiser-Franz-Joseph-Platz, where a ramp followed. The east tunnel continued almost in a straight line and ended east of the Opernhaus. The lines of Städtische Straßenbahnen and BESTAG were to be routed through the west tunnel, the lines of GBS and its subsidiaries through the east tunnel. To avoid an intersection at the northern ramp, the city allowed GBS to route its lines coming from the northwest through the west tunnel as well. After problems with the signaling system, the west tunnel went into operation on December 17, 1916, with the east tunnel following two days later.

In addition to the newly created "Städtischer Ostring", the plans envisaged new routes in the west and north of Berlin. Coming from Schönhauser Allee, a route via Bornholmer Straße, Christianiastraße and Seestraße to Oskarplatz was planned, as well as a connection from this route via Schulstraße and Luxemburger Straße to the existing network. This connection was to be served by the discontinued Green/White and Blue/White lines. The existing Red/White line was to be closed from Augustenburger Platz via Alt-Moabit, Hansaplatz, Großer Stern and Potsdamer Platz to the "Städtischer Großer Ring"; in addition, a "Städtischer Westring" line was to run along this route and through the Lindentunnel. Due to the First World War, only the extension from Virchow Hospital to the junction of Ottostrasse and Alt-Moabit could be completed on May 1, 1915. A track connection to the Berlin-Charlottenburg tramway network existed here for the continuation in the direction of Großer Stern. Work on the northern lines continued until the end of 1917, by which time they had been completed with the exception of the overhead lines.

=== Merger to form the Berlin tramway and further development ===
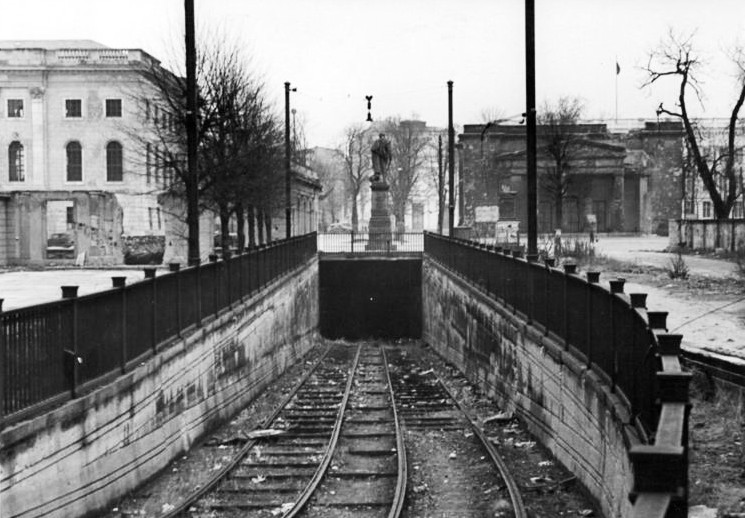
Lindentunnel, 1950

A new consent agreement was concluded in 1918 between the Greater Berlin Association, which had been responsible for transport matters in the capital region since 1912, and the Große Berliner Straßenbahn and its subsidiaries. In this agreement, the special-purpose association granted GBS the right to take over its subsidiaries in full. After this happened, the municipal association acquired GBS and the private Berliner Ostbahnen. When the Greater Berlin Act came into force on October 1, 1920, the unified municipality of Greater Berlin became its legal successor. With the exception of the elevated railway company, all streetcar companies in the city were now in municipal hands. GBS then took over the operations of the formerly independent suburban municipalities in several stages before the municipal streetcars and the Berlin electric streetcars were merged on December 13, 1920, to form the Berliner Straßenbahn (BSt) merger.

With the founding of the Berlin tramway, the largest uniformly managed tramway operation in Europe at the time was created. There were still major operational problems due to the lack of track connections between individual sub-networks and the different types of pantographs. For cost reasons, the roller pantographs used by the GBS were preferred, although the suspension pantographs used by the municipal tramway allowed a much simpler catenary construction. In the course of the changeover, the Berlin tramway shut down a number of parallel lines, for example in Ebertystraße. Further sections followed with the inflation 1923. Traffic through the Lindentunnel was suspended for six months from September 10, 1923, while the West Tunnel remained permanently closed.

In April 1921, the two remaining former municipal lines were assigned the numbers 13 (red/white) and 9 (green). Line 13 was renamed Line 4 in the spring of 1922 and closed via the Großer Stern to form the "Ost-West-Ring", which largely corresponded to the planned "Städtischer Großer Ring". The line from Seestraße to Bornholmer Straße, which had already been built by the municipal tramway, went into operation on October 12, 1928. On the same day, line 8 to "Nordring" was closed.

The BVG, which was formed in 1929 from the merger of the Straßenbahn, Hochbahngesellschaft and Allgemeine Berliner Omnibus AG, gave up the section from Stettiner Bahnhof to Dorotheenstraße with the construction of the Nordsüd-S-Bahn-Tunnel in the mid-1930s. The Lindentunnel remained without scheduled traffic after the end of the World War II until 1950, and the line was finally taken out of service after the III World Festival of Youth on September 2, 1951. The BVG discontinued streetcar services on the remaining sections in West Berlin until 1964.

With the exception of the inner city sections around the Lindentunnel and the section in Ebertystraße and Thaerstraße, the sections located in East Berlin were retained. They were mainly served by Line 4 between Eberswalder Straße and Warschauer Straße and Line 3 (the successor to Line 8), which was created in 1948 and ran along Bornholmer Straße to the sector border. After being renamed twice, these lines have been operating as the M10 and M13 respectively since 2004. After the Wende, individual sections of the line were rebuilt between 1995 and 2006, which had previously been used by the municipal streetcars.

== Vehicles ==
The municipal streetcar fleet had a very uniform design. By 1919, the city had procured 115 four-axle maximum railcars and 78 two-axle sidecars, which were given the designations Type 8 or Typ 6 according to the number of windows. There were slight variations within the series, which were indicated by majuscules in the type designation. The paintwork was ochre yellow with black trim. The decorative lines were painted red-brown, as were the car numbers and lettering. The numbers were written on the ends and next to the end entrances on the side rails, with the lettering Strassenbahnen der Stadt Berlin in between. The Berlin city coat of arms was emblazoned in the center. BESTAG also operated eight motor coaches and ten trailer coaches of this type.

The wagon bodies were made of oak. The floor frame was also made of oak and was reinforced with iron. The railcars had two maximum bogies, the sidecars did not have a separate bogie. Those responsible attached great importance to a tasteful interior. The passenger compartment was clad in polished mahogany wood. Fittings, handrails and handles were made of brass. The ceiling was made of bird's-eye maple and covered with mirror varnish. The lighting was provided by two two-armed and one three-armed chandelier as well as the lantern roof. The side windows were separated in the upper quarter, the lower larger part could be lowered for ventilation. In addition, the skylights could be opened if required. The seats were mounted transversely in a 2+1 arrangement. The backrests could be folded down so that passengers could always sit facing the direction of travel. The railcars had 24 seats, the sidecars 18 seats in eight and six rows respectively. The entrance platforms of both types of railcar were open; of the railcars delivered in 1919, at least railcars 50 and 51 had front glazing.

The vehicles were initially numbered consecutively. The railcars delivered in 1913 were given numbers in the 200 range, at the same time the company gave the sidecars uniform numbers in the 100 range. The resulting gaps in the number range below 100 were partially filled by the railcars delivered in 1919. The Fahrzeugwerkstätten Falkenried of the Straßen-Eisenbahn Gesellschaft in Hamburg were the main manufacturers, four railcars came from Gottfried Lindner AG in Ammendorf near Halle (Saale) and 35 railcars from the Linke-Hofmann-Werke in Breslau. The electrical equipment came from Siemens & Halske.

With the transition to the Berlin tramway, the sidecars were given the numbers 1588–1665 and the railcars the numbers 4394–4399 and 5323–5431. In order to reduce the maintenance costs of the numerous series of railcars, the BSt converted railcars from smaller series to sidecars at the beginning of the 1920s and, conversely, larger series of sidecars to railcars. The 78 sidecars of the former type 6 received the corresponding electrical equipment together with the ten sidecars of the former BESTAG in 1924. Since then, the vehicles ran as type U3q with the car numbers 3102 and 3251–3337. The Berliner Straßenbahn replaced the open platforms on both car series with the closed Berliner Einheitsplattform. There were several renumberings at this time. The maximum railcars were grouped together numerically, some of the conversion railcars were given new numbers to keep the series from 3300 upwards free for the Mitteleinstiegswagen ordered in 1927.

From 1934, the BVG operated the types as TDS 08/24 (maximum railcar) and T 08/24 (conversion railcar) respectively. After the administrative separation of the BVG, BVG-West phased out its vehicles by 1955, as the use of wooden superstructures was no longer permitted in passenger transport. Some of the former sidecars were used in the work car fleet until the 1960s. BVG-Ost had its vehicles completely rebuilt in the 1950s and replaced the lantern roofs with barrel roofs. The T 08/24 were handed over to the companies in Cottbus, Dessau, Schöneiche and Zwickau by 1959, where they continued to operate until 1972. Most of the maximum cars were in service until 1968. 34 railcars served as "donor vehicles" for the Rekoprogramm, the others were taken out of service by 1970.

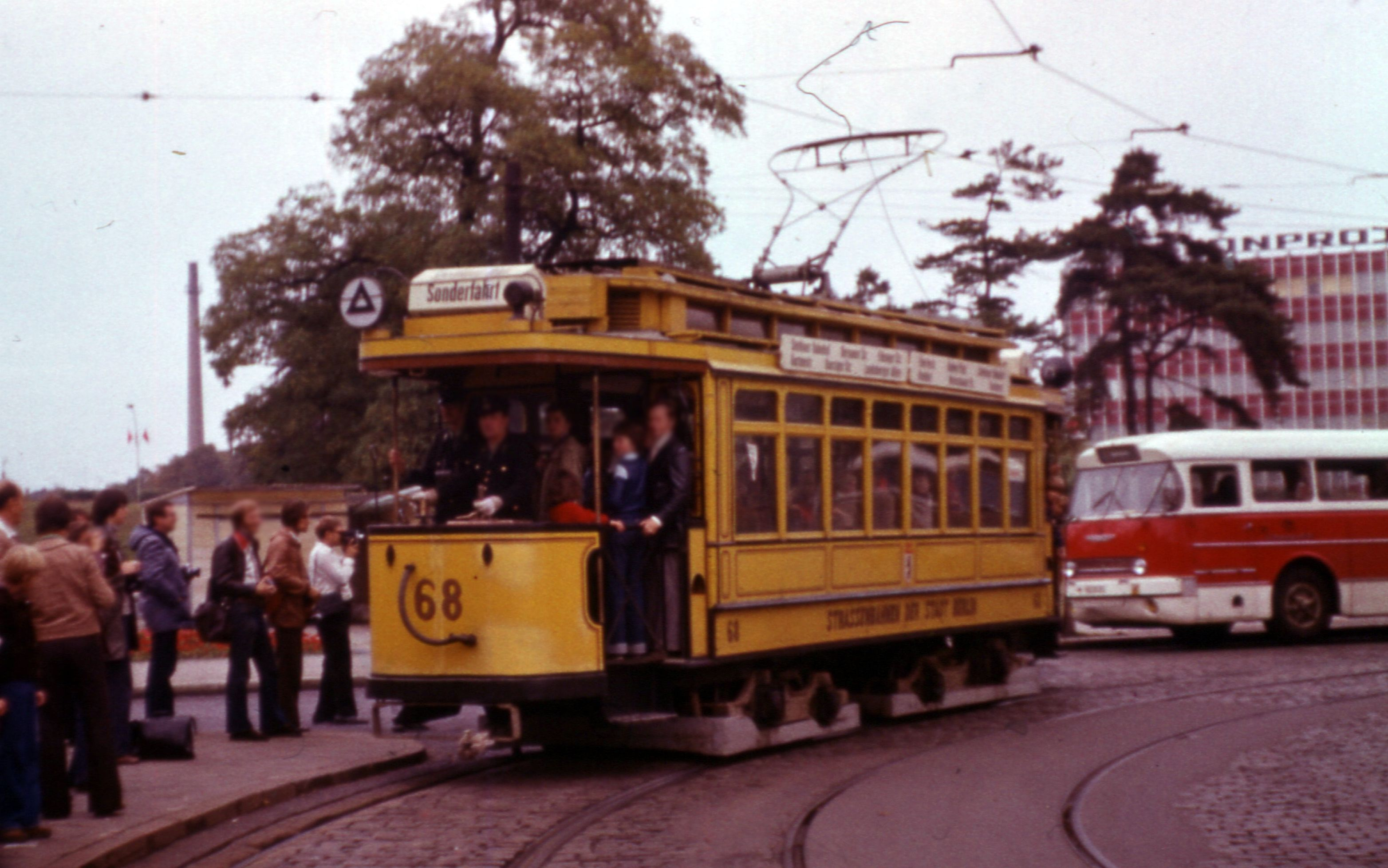
Historical SSB railcar 68 on the occasion of the anniversary "100 years electric locomotive – 50 years Raw Dessau – 30 years GDR" in Dessau, 1979

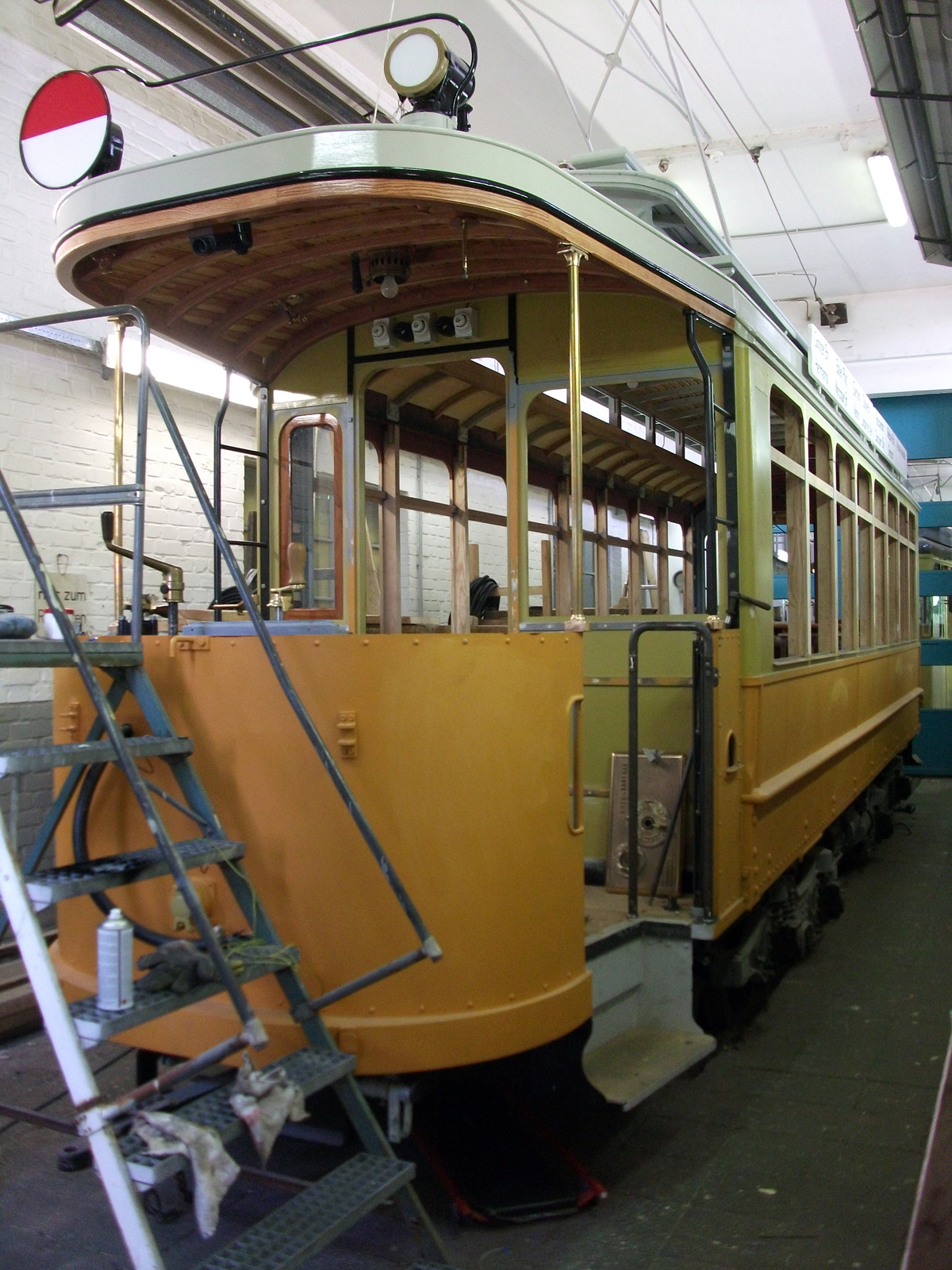
Historic railcar 218 during its refurbishment in Woltersdorf, 2012

Two railcars have been preserved as historic vehicles: Railcar 68 (ex BVG 5366) was restored to its original condition in 1973 and was in service until 1990. However, changes in legislation led to its decommissioning in 1990. Since 1993, the vehicle has been in the Monumentenhalle of the German Museum of Technology Berlin. Railcar 218 (ex BVG 5403) came to Woltersdorf in 2008 and was refurbished there until the 100th anniversary of operation of the Woltersdorfer Straßenbahn tramway in May 2013 and then presented. The former sidecar 37 (ex BVG 3225) was used as a sheepfold after its time in service in Dessau; no further information is available about its whereabouts.

Vehicle overview
Type	Manufacturer	Year of construction	Car no. (until 1913)	Car no. (from 1913)	Car no. (from 1920)	Whereabouts
Railcar (from 1934: TDS 08/24)
8A	Falkenried	1908	1–28		4399, 5323–5349	1928 Tw 4399 in Tw 5437
8C	Lindner	1919	29^{II}–41^{II}		5427–5431, 5421–5425, 4394–4396	semi-open platforms; 1927 Tw 4394–4396 in Tw 5432–5434
8A	Falkenried	1909	42–49		5350–5357	
8C	Falkenried	1919	50^{II}+51^{II}		4397+4398	1928 in Tw 5435+5436
8B	Falkenried	1910	60–77		5358–5374, 5426	
8B	Falkenried	1912	90–100		5375–5385	Tw 90 with 30 seats
8B	LHW	1913	201–235		5386–5420	
Sidecar (from 1934: T 08/24)
6	Falkenried	1908	29–40	144–155	1631–1642	1924 conversion to Tw 3304–3316; 1927 to Tw 3217–3229
6	Falkenried	1909	41, 50–59	156–166	1643–1653	1924 conversion to Tw 3317–3326; 1927 to Tw 3230–3239
6B	Falkenried	1910	78–89	167–178	1654–1665	1924 Conversion to Tw 3327–3337, 3102; 1927 to Tw 3240–3250, 3213
6B	Falkenried	1911	101–115		1588–1602	1924 Conversion to Tw 3261–3275
6B	Falkenried	1913	116–143		1603–1630	1924 Conversion into Tw 3276–3303; 1927 Tw 3300–3303 into Tw 3212–3216

== Infrastructure ==
=== Route network ===
The length of the line increased from 10.4 kilometers in the opening year to 31.2 kilometers in 1917. The majority of these lines were double-track. The standard gauge was chosen as the gauge, the power supply was via overhead line and pantograph with an operating voltage of 500 volts direct current. Measured against the total length of the Berlin streetcar network, the urban lines accounted for less than five percent.

The relatively late expansion of the network meant that the railroad had to switch to side roads and routes operated by other companies, especially in inner-city areas. Third-party railroads such as GBS were able to permit the use of longer sections of track for a fee or refuse it completely; they were only obliged to grant permission for short sections. In cases where both sides could not agree, the SSB had to set up appropriate detour routes, such as in the Petersburger Straße area and at Hallesches Tor.

In 1908, the cars of the municipal streetcars ran on 1.8 kilometers of foreign tracks, in 1920 it was 13.5 kilometers. Conversely, the lines of other companies also used the SSB tracks. Longer shared sections existed mainly with BESTAG, as the majority of these were owned by the city of Berlin. In addition, the BESTAG railcars also used pantographs. The following tables provide an overview of the lines operated by SSB and the sections of SSB line operated by other railroads.

Route overview
Section	Operation
Routes used by the SSB
Dorotheenstraße (between Lindentunnel and Universitätsstraße)	BCS
Artilleriestraße – Ebertbrücke – Prinz-Friedrich-Karl-Straße	BESTAG
Elsasser Straße (between Artilleriestraße and Borsigstraße)	GBS
Invalidenstraße (between Borsigstraße and Gartenstraße)	GBS
Gartenstraße (between Invalidenstraße and Bernauer Straße)	BESTAG
Birkenstraße (between Wilhelmshavener Straße and Putlitzstraße)	GBS
Fennstraße	GBS
Hussitenstraße (between Grenzstraße and Voltastraße)	BESTAG
Landsberger Allee (between Elbinger Straße and Ebertystraße)	NöBV
Wiener Straße (from Görlitzer Ufer) – Grünauer Straße (to Kottbusser Ufer/Friedelstraße)	BESTAG
Friedelstraße (between Kottbusser Ufer/Grünauer Straße and Pflügerstraße)	GBS
Hollmannstraße	BESTAG
Lindenstraße (between Hollmannstraße and Markgrafenstraße)	GBS
Markgrafenstraße (between Lindenstraße and Schützenstraße)	BESTAG
Königgrätzer Straße (between Köthener Straße and Prinz-Albrecht-Straße and between Hedemannstraße and Großbeerenstraße)	GBS
Schöneberger Ufer (from Köthener Straße) – Flottwellstraße (to Lützowstraße)	GBS
Zimmerstraße – Prinz-Albrecht-Straße	BCS
Wilhelmstraße (between Kochstraße and Anhalter Straße)	GBS
Routes used by other companies
Lindentunnel (Westtunnel)	BESTAG, GBS
Linden tunnel (Osttunnel)	GBS, SBV
Warschauer Straße (between Revaler Straße and Rudolfstraße)	Flb
Markgrafenstraße (from Schützenstraße) – Behrenstraße (to Lindentunnel)	BESTAG
Wilhelmstraße – Hedemannstraße	GBS
Köthener Straße	GBS

Network expansion
Financial year¹	Route length (in km)	Track length (in km)²	Line length (in km)
1908	10,4	22,6	16,1
1909	12,6	28,4	20,5
1910	13,8	31,0	22,7
1911	13,8	31,0	24,8
1912	14,5	33,1	27,4
1913	22,0	49,0	41,1
1914	26,7	58,6	32,6
1915	29,4³	64,7³	34,9
1916	31,2³	69,5³	37,4
1917	31,2³	69,5³	37,4
¹ Figures refer to the end of the financial year ² including operating and hall tracks ³ including completed lines not yet in operation

=== Depots ===
==== North depot (Kniprodestraße) ====
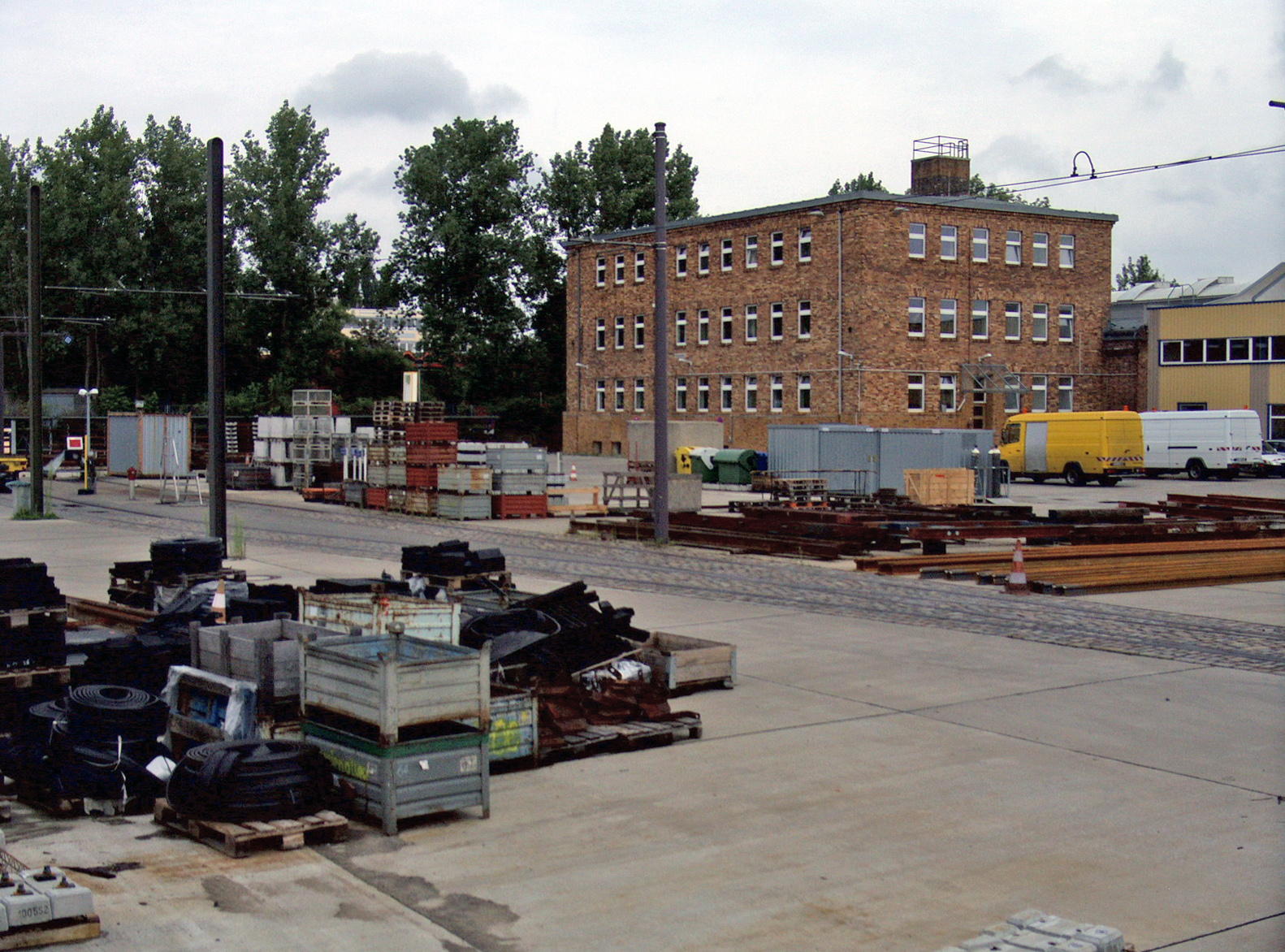
The Kniprodestraße depot is now used as a rail storage facility, 2007

The SSB initially had a depot in Kniprodestraße at its disposal for operations. This went into operation together with the first line on July 1, 1908. The company leased the property with an area of 8671 square meters from the city. From 1908, there was initially a carriage and workshop hall with space for 45 vehicles on 3359 square meters, as well as a two-storey residential and service building, a two-storey storage shed and a gatehouse. By 1912, the facility had expanded to four halls for 120 vehicles. After the transition to the Berlin tramway, the depot was given the internal number 25. In 1923 the Berlin tramway closed the depot and continued to use it as a training workshop. The Berliner Verkehrsbetriebe in turn used the facility as a depot for work railcars and as a track construction yard. The site now serves as a rail storage facility.

==== South depot (Urbanstraße) ====
With the expansion of the network to the south, the administration decided to build a second depot in Urbanstraße 167. The depot, which opened on November 25, 1913, mainly housed the locomotives and sidecars of the southern lines. The site, with an area of 7059 square meters, comprised two carriage sheds on 3004 square meters and a capacity of 60 carriages, plus a workshop extension, a car shed, sand storage sheds and a three-storey service building. The yard was also taken over in 1920 and given the number 9. In 1923 it was closed.

== Recipe ==
Tariff development
data	Single ticket	Double ticket	Collective ticket (number of journeys)	Monthly ticket (full-payer)	Monthly ticket (schoolchildren)	Workers' weekly ticket (6 journeys)
1. Jul. 1908	0,10 M	–	–	6,70 M	3,00 M	0,50 M
1. Jun. 1918	0,15 M	0,25 M	1.00 M (8 trips)	9,75 M	4,00 M	0,50 M
24. Jan. 1919	0,20 M	0,35 M	1.40 M (8 trips)	13,70 M	5,00 M	0,85 M
1. Oct. 1919	0,20 M	–	–	15,60 M	5,50 M	1,00 M
1. Jan. 1920	0,30 M	–	2.00 M (7 trips)	23,50 M	8,00 M	1,50 M
1. Apr. 1920	0,50 M	–	–	40,00 M	12,00 M	2,50 M
21. May 1920	0,70 M	–	5,00 M (8 trips)	56,00 M	15,00 M	3,50 M
1. Dec. 1920	0,80 M	–	6,00 M (8 trips)	70,00 M	18,00 M	4,00 M

From the opening, a standard 10 pfennig fare for an uninterrupted journey applied on the municipal streetcar lines. In addition, the company issued monthly tickets at 6.70 marks and workers' weekly tickets for six journeys at 50 pfennigs each and twelve journeys at 1.00 marks each. From August 1908, monthly student tickets were also issued at 3.00 marks. In the early days, there were also monthly tickets for policemen in uniform and plainclothes at 2.05 and 3.10 marks respectively.

A special agreement was made between the city and the elevated railway company when the 1st Flachbahnstrecke was purchased. From 1901, in addition to the 10 pfennig standard fare, a transfer fare to the elevated line at Bahnhof Warschauer Brücke station applied on this line. For through journeys from the Flachbahn to the Hochbahn and vice versa, the fare was five pfennigs cheaper than buying two tickets. This regulation remained in place after January 1, 1910, until the end of 1919 and only applied to the section between Zentralviehhof and Warschauer Brücke.

Due to inflation, the city had to gradually increase fares from mid-1918. The level corresponded to the standard fare that also applied on the lines of the Große Berliner Straßenbahn and its branch lines. From June 1, 1916, the 12.5 pfennig standard fare applied. According to this tariff, a single journey cost 15 pfennigs, double tickets cost 25 pfennigs, and collective tickets for eight journeys were available for 1.00 marks. The cost rose to 80 pfennigs for a single journey by the beginning of December 1920.

== Operating results ==
Company statistics 1908–1917
Financial year¹	Operating revenues (in millions of marks)	Operating expenses (in millions of marks)	Net profit (in million marks)	Pers. interviewed (in millions)	Car-km (in millions)	Bef. Pers./ Wagen-km
1908	0,550	0,331	0,128	5,77	1,01	5,71
1909	1,046	0,603	0,254	10,94	1,85	5,91
1910	1,701	0,841	0,568	18,10	3,03	5,97
1911	2,030	1,071	0,646	22,01	4,04	5,44
1912	2,218	1,304	0,603	23,83	4,69	5,08
1913	2,603	1,609	0,405	27,94	5,96	4,70
1914	2,251	1,480	0,065	24,42	4,81	5,08
1915	2,478	1,618	0,120	26,79	5,19	5,16
1916	2,941	1,674	0,364	31,61	5,43	5,82
1917	3,925	2,390	0,547	40,00	5,30	7,55
¹ The financial year ran from April 1 to March 31 of the following year; in 1908 from July 1, 1908, to March 31, 1909

The profits of the lines opened in 1908 initially exceeded expectations. Until well into the First World War, the company was able to record considerable net profits in some cases, which were used to repay the construction capital and benefited the city treasury. The lines opened in 1913 temporarily diminished this success, as they had a significantly lower volume of traffic. There was serious competition here from the "Sechseromnibus", a bus with a standard fare of five pfennigs (ugs. "Sechser"). In 1918 expenditure exceeded income for the first time. Wage and operating costs had led to this development, in addition to the steadily rising inflation rate. While losses totaled 35,000 marks in 1918, by 1919 the figure had risen to 2.6 million marks and by 1920 to around four million marks. This trend ultimately continued for the Berlin tramway.

== Literature ==
- Siegfried Münzinger et al.: Die Straßenbahnen der Stadt Berlin. In: Berliner Verkehrsblätter. Hefte 6, 8, 9, 10 (1964), 1 (1966).
- Hans-Joachim Pohl (1983), "Die Städtischen Straßenbahnen in Berlin. Geschichte eines kommunalen Verkehrsbetriebes", Verkehrsgeschichtliche Blätter, vol. Heft 5
