= Dana Tomlin =

American academic

Charles Dana Tomlin is an author, professor, and originator of Map Algebra, a vocabulary and conceptual framework for classifying ways to combine map data to produce new maps. Tomlin's teaching and research focus on the development and application of geographic information systems (GIS). He is currently a professor at the University of Pennsylvania School of Design and an adjunct professor at the Yale School of Forestry and Environmental Studies, having also taught at the Harvard Graduate School of Design and the Ohio State University School of Natural Resources. His coursework in Landscape Architecture has extensively included GIS and cartographic modeling applications.

== Contributions to GIS ==
Tomlin's contributions to GIS extend across a number of years and a wide variety of applications. As a student at Harvard University in the mid-1970s, he developed the Tomlin Subsystem of IMGRID as a master's thesis. Many analytical functions in IMGRID were later integrated into Imagine, a satellite image processing application developed by ERDAS.

As a doctoral student at Yale University in the late 1970s, and as a junior faculty member at Harvard in the early 1980s, Tomlin developed MAP (the Map Analysis Package), one of the most widely used programs of its kind. The open source GRASS application derives many of its raster analytical capabilities directly from MAP and was extensively used by the U.S. Army Corps of Engineers and other federal agencies throughout the late 1980s. Tomlin's work on MAP has also been directly inherited by a long list of other software packages, including, OSUMAP, MAP II, MapFactory, MFWorks, MacGIS, IDRISI, MapBox, pMap, and MGE.

In 1990, Tomlin led an informal group of City and Regional Planning doctoral students at the University of Pennsylvania in founding the Cartographic Modeling Laboratory. The Cartographic Modeling Lab conducts academic research and urban and social policy analysis using GIS and spatial research applications. Tomlin has been co-director of the lab since 1995.

== Map algebra ==
Tomlin's landmark book, Geographic Information Systems and Cartographic Modeling, was published in 1990 to expand on his earlier dissertation work on Map Algebra. A significantly revised version was released as GIS and Cartographic Modeling in 2012. Map Algebra is used for a broad array of GIS modeling applications, including suitability modeling, surface analysis, density analysis, statistics, hydrology, landscape ecology, real estate and geographic prioritization.

Early in its development, Tomlin made the decision to openly share all of the source code, documentation and algorithms associated with Map Algebra. Consequently, the overall concepts of Map Algebra are still used today in every GIS application that supports raster calculations. Esri’s Spatial Analyst solution, as well as its predecessor, the GRID module of ArcInfo, has incorporated most of the Map Algebra concepts.

While primarily applied to raster data, Map Algebra has also been extended to support 3D, temporal and other cartographic modeling applications. Tomlin continues to freely share his ideas on Map Algebra with students, educators, software developers and others in the GIS industry through articles in cartographic and environmental journals.

== See also ==
- Map algebra
- Field (geography)
- Geographic information system
- ERDAS IMAGINE
- GRASS GIS
- ArcInfo
