= Location-allocation =

Location-allocation refers to algorithms used primarily in a geographic information system to determine an optimal location for one or more facilities that will service demand from a given set of points. Algorithms can assign those demand points to one or more facilities, taking into account factors such as the number of facilities available, their cost, and the maximum impedance from a facility to a point. Location-allocation models aim to locate the optimal location for each facility. Allocating a number of people for each facility, according to the inputs of each model. How to find a point (school) among three points (people) at which the least distance between it and such points can be achieved? That was the historical dilemma formulated by The French mathematician Fermat to The Italian physicist Torricelli (seventeenth century), through whom Weber in 1909 developed his views on industrial locations.

== See also ==
- Geographic information system
