= Distance decay =

Sociological effect

Distance decay is a geographical term which describes the effect of distance on cultural or spatial interactions. The distance decay effect states that the interaction between two locales declines as the distance between them increases. Once the distance is outside of the two locales' activity space, their interactions begin to decrease. It is thus an assertion that the mathematics of the inverse square law in physics can be applied to many geographic phenomena, and is one of the ways in which physics principles such as gravity are often applied metaphorically to geographic situations.

== Mathematical models ==
Distance decay is graphically represented by a curving line that swoops concavely downward as distance along the x-axis increases. Distance decay can be mathematically represented as an inverse-square law by the expression

$$I = \text{constant} \times d^{-2}$$

or

$$I \propto 1/d^2,$$

where I is interaction and d is distance. In practice, it is often parameterized to fit a specific situation, such as

$$I = \frac{A}{(d + B)^k},$$

in which the constant A is a vertical stretching factor, B is a horizontal shift (so that the curve has a y-axis intercept at a finite value), and k is the decay power.

It can take other forms such as negative exponential, i.e.

$$I \propto e^{-d}.$$

In addition to fitting the parameters, a cutoff value can be added to a distance decay function to specify a distance beyond which spatial interaction drops to zero, or to delineate a "zone of indifference" in which all interactions have the same strength.

== Applications ==
Distance decay is evident in town/city centres. It can refer to various things which decline with greater distance from the center of the central business district (CBD):

- density of pedestrian traffic
- street quality
- quality of shops (depending on definitions of 'quality' and 'center')
- height of buildings
- price of land

Distance decay weighs into the decision to migrate, leading many migrants to move less far.

With the advent of faster travel and communications technology, such as telegraphs, telephones, broadcasting, and internet, the effects of distance have been reduced, a trend known as time-space convergence. Exceptions include places previously connected by now-abandoned railways, for example, have fallen off the beaten path.

== Related concepts ==
Related terms include "friction of distance", which describes the forces that create the distance decay effect. Waldo R. Tobler's "First law of geography", an informal statement that "All things are related, but near things are more related than far things," and the mathematical principle spatial autocorrelation are similar expressions of distance decay effects. "Loss of Strength Gradient" holds that the amount of a nation's military power that could be brought to bear in any part of the world depends on geographic distance.

== See also ==
- Concentric zone model
- Concepts and Techniques in Modern Geography
- Gravity model
- Inverse distance weighting
- Inverse-square law
- The Isolated State
- Trip distribution
- Tobler's first law of geography
- Tobler's second law of geography
