= Free shipping =

Marketing tactic

Free shipping is a marketing tactic used primarily by online vendors and mail-order catalogs as a sales strategy to attract customers.

== Online sales model ==
Internet vendors benefit from a simplified sales model as compared to traditional brick-and-mortar stores. By storing goods remotely at a warehouse location and shipping goods directly to a consumer, significant transportation needs are eliminated both on the part of the vendor (shipping goods to stores) and by the consumer (traveling to stores). Additionally, near-universal access to the Internet means that a relatively few warehouse locations can compete with a market without having to deal with amounts of real-estate.

== Shipping and fees ==
The simplified business model provides potentially lower costs or higher profit margins for remote vendors. The 'up-front pricing' model attracts customers with low up-front prices reflecting the lower cost of goods to the vendor with less overhead. The vendor would then add the cost of shipping, and any other applicable fees to the order before processing. Since the vendor typically makes the shipping arrangements, it is entirely possible that the cost of shipping passed on to the consumer will not be the same as the cost of shipping borne by the vendor. Some online vendors use this as a source of revenue, further increasing profits or allowing the vendor to advertise even lower up-front prices.

Based on ComScore data 65% of eCommerce transactions in Q4 2017 in the United States were with free shipping. This figure has been consistent for the last few years (ranging between 58% and 69%). Moreover, US respondents asked in the survey listed free shipping (54% mentions) as a most important factor for online shipping. Next in line were exclusive online deals (23%), no sales tax (10%), fast shipping (9%) and in store pickup (5%).

Many shoppers also perceive shipping costs as a barrier to place the order and leave the shopping cart before purchasing. 31.6% of respondents mentioned the latter as a main barrier during the online shopping experience based on Internet Retailer / Bizrate Insight consumer survey conducted in May 2018.

Some retailers offer free shipping on some orders or above a certain value threshold. This can vary depending on the merchandise category. Retailers usually place the threshold slightly above average order value in order to encourage buyers to purchase more products. The margin then increases for retailers and thus they will be offset partially the shipping costs.

== See also ==
- Marketing
- Internet business
- Online shopping
