= Ian Cook =

Ian Cook may refer to:

- Ian Cook (artist) (born 1983), English artist
- Ian Cook (footballer) (1924–1989), Scottish footballer
- Ian Cook (geographer), professor of geography at the University of Exeter
- Ian Cook (psychiatrist) (born 1960), physician-researcher at UCLA
- Ian M. Cook, British businessman
- Ian Arthur Naunton Cook (1934–1994), British police officer in the South Pacific
- Ian Cook (racing driver) in 1967 Tasman Series

== See also ==
- Iain Cook (born 1974), guitarist
- Ian Cooke (disambiguation)
