= Concepts and Techniques in Modern Geography =

Series of geography texts, 1975–1996

- Cover of the first CATMOG in series, 1975
- Author: Various
- Country: United Kingdom
- Language: English
- Discipline: Geography
- Published: 1975-1996
- Media type: Print (Paperback)
- No. of books: 59
- Website: quantile.info/catmog

Concepts and Techniques in Modern Geography (CATMOG), is a series of 59 short publications, each focused on an individual method or theory in geography. The CATMOGs were published by the Study Group in Quantitative Methods of the Institute of British Geographers, and were designed to be cheap and flexible for use in college courses. The series may have inspired similar publications, and the content is still relevant to researchers today.

Each CATMOG publication was written on an individual topic in geography rather than a series of broad topics like traditional textbooks and ranged between 40 and 70 pages. This à la carte approach allowed only purchasing publications on topics of interest, keeping each CATMOG relatively cheap and accessible, lowering student costs with early copies sold for around £1.30 or $2.00. This also offered instructors more flexibility in designing courses. The first of these publications was published in 1975, and the last in 1996. Each was written by someone working professionally with its topic, which created some issues in consistency between publications in terms of expected knowledge level and general formatting. As they focused on core concepts of the discipline and were written by experts in the field, they are still often cited today when discussing specific topics.

The CATMOG series was published between 1975 and 1996. While the CATMOG is out of print, it has been noted as an example for at least one similar publication, is speculated to have inspired Scientific Geography Series, and has been compared to the Briefs in Regional Science series. The concepts are still relevant to GIS. The Quantitative Methods Research Group (QMRG) at the Royal Geographical Society (with the Institute for British Geographers) has made most of the CATMOG available to download for free on their website. The last CATMOG published in 1996 was included as a chapter in the book The Map Reader: Theories of Mapping Practice and Cartographic Representation.

== List of CATMOGs ==
List of CATMOGs
CATMOG number	Title	Author(s)	Year	ISBN	Ref
1	An Introduction to Markov Chain Analysis	Lyndhurst Collins	1975	ISBN 0-902246-43-7	
2	Distance Decay in Spatial Interactions	Peter J. Taylor	1975	ISBN 0-86094-090-X	
3	Understanding Canonical Correlation Analysis	David Clark	1975	ISBN 0-902246-49-6	
4	Some Theoretical and Applied Aspects of Spatial Interaction Shopping Models	Stan Openshaw	1975	ISBN 0-902246-51-8	
5	An Introduction to Trend Surface Analysis	David Unwin	1978	ISBN 0-902246-51-8	
6	Classification in Geography	R.J. Johnston	1976	ISBN 0-902246-54-2	
7	An Introduction to Factor Analysis	John Goddard & Andrew Kirby	1976	ISBN 0-902246-55-0	
8	Principal Components Analysis	Stu Daultrey	1976	ISBN 0-902246-56-9	
9	Causal Inferences from Dichotomous Variables	Norman Davidson	1976	ISBN 0-902246-59-3	
10	Introduction to the Use of Logit Models in Geography	Neil Wrigley	1976	ISBN 0-902246-62-3	
11	Linear Programming: Elementary Geographical Applications of the Transportation Problem	Alan Hay	1977	ISBN 0-902246-65-8	
12	An Introduction to Quadrat Analysis	R. W. Thomas	1977	ISBN 0-902246-66-6	
13	An Introduction to Time-Geography	Nigel Thrift	1977	ISBN 0-902246-67-4	
14	An Introduction to Graph Theoretical Methods in Geography	Keith J. Tinkler	1977	ISBN 0-902246-68-2	
15	Linear Regression in Geography	Rob Ferguson	1977	ISBN 0-902246-87-9	
16	Probability Surface Mapping. An Introduction with Examples and Fortran Programmes	Neil Wrigley	1977	ISBN 0-902246-88-7	
17	Sampling Methods for Geographical Research	Chris J. Dixon & Bridget Leach	1977	ISBN 0-902246-96-8	
18	Questionnaires and Interviews in Geographical Research	Chris J. Dixon & Bridget Leach	1977	ISBN 0-902246-97-6	
19	Analysis of Frequency Distributions	V. Gardiner & G. Gardiner	1979	ISBN 0-902246-98-4	
20	Analysis of Covariance and Comparison of Regression Lines	John Silk	1979	ISBN 0-902246-99-2	
21	An Introduction to the Use of Simultaneous-Equation Regression Analysis in Geography	Daniel Todd	1979	ISBN 978-0860940289	
22	Transfer Function Modelling: Relationship Between Time Series Variables	Pong-wai Lai	1979	ISBN 0-86094-029-2	
23	Stochastic Processes in One Dimensional Series: an Introduction	Keith S. Richards	1979	ISBN 0860940306	
24	Linear Programming: The Simplex Method with Geographical Applications	James E. Killen	1979	ISBN 0-86094-032-2	
25	Directional Statistics	Gary L. Gaile & James E. Burt	1980	ISBN 0-86094-032-2	
26	Potential Models in Human Geography	David C. Rich	1980	ISBN 0-86094-044-6	
27	Causal Modelling: The Simon-Blalock Approach	Dennis G. Pringle	1980	ISBN 0-86094-045-4	
28	Statistical Forecasting	Robert J. Bennett	1981	ISBN 0-86094-064-0	
29	The British Census	John C. Dewdney	1981	ISBN 0-86094-070-5	
30	The Analysis of Variance	John Silk	1981	ISBN 9780860940715	
31	Information Statistics in Geography	R. W. Thomas	1981	ISBN 0-86094-090-X	
32	Centrographic Measures in Geography	Aharon Kellerman	1981	ISBN 0-86094-091-8	
33	An Introduction to Dimensional Analysis for Geographers	Robin Haynes	1982	ISBN 0-86094-097-7	
34	An Introduction to Q-Analysis	John R. Beaumont & Anthony C. Gatrell	1982	ISBN 0-86094-106-X	
35	The Agricultural Census – United Kingdom and United States	Gordon L. Clark	1982	ISBN 0-86094-115-9	
36	Order-Neighbour Analysis	Graeme Aplin	1983	ISBN 0-86094-126-4	
37	Classification Using Information Statistics	R.J. Johnston & R.K. Semple	1983	ISBN 0-86094-133-7	
38	The Modifiable Areal Unit Problem	Stan Openshaw	1983	ISBN 0-86094-134-5	
39	Survey Research in Underdeveloped Countries	Chris J. Dixon & Bridget Leach	1984	ISBN 0-86094-135-3	
40	Innovation Diffusion: Contemporary Geographical Approaches	Gordon L. Clark	1984	ISBN 0-86094-168-X	
41	Choice in Field Surveying	Roger P. Kirby	1985	ISBN 0-86094-174-4	
42	An Introduction to Likelihood Analysis	Andrew Pickles	1985	ISBN 0-86094-190-6	
43	The UK Census of Population 1981	John C. Dewdney	1985	ISBN 0-86094-191-4	
44	Geography and Humanism	John Pickles	1986	ISBN 0-86094-220-1	
45	Voronoi (Thiessen) Polygons	Barry N. Boots	1986	ISBN 0-86094-221-X	
46	Goodness-of-Fit Statistics	Alexander Stewart Fotheringham & Daniel C. Knudsen	1987	ISBN 0-86094-222-8	
47	Spatial Autocorrelation	Michael F. Goodchild	1986	ISBN 0-86094-223-6	
48	Introductory Matrix Algebra	Keith Tinkler	1987	ISBN 0-86094-224-4	
49	Spatial Applications of Exploratory Data Analysis	David Sibley	1988	ISBN 0-86094-228-7	
50	The Application of Nonparametric Statistical Tests in Geography	John Coshall	1989	ISBN 1-87246-400-9	
51	The Statistical Analysis of Contingency Table Designs	L. G. O'Brien	1989	ISBN 1-872464-01-7	
52	A Classification of Geographical Information Systems Literature and Applications	Ian Bracken, Gary Higgs, David Martin & Chris Webster	1989	ISBN 1-872464-02-5	
53	An Introduction to Market Analysis	John R. Beaumont	1991	ISBN 1-872464-03-3	
54	Multi-Level Models for Geographical Research	Kelvyn Jones	1991	ISBN 1-872464-04-1	
55	Causal and Simulation Modelling Using System Dynamics	Ian Moffatt	1991	ISBN 1-872464-05-X	
56	The UK Census of Population 1991	David Martin	1993	ISBN 1-872464-06-8	
57	Dynamic Analysis of Spatial Population Systems	Jianfa Shen	1994	ISBN 1-872464-07-6	
58	Doing Ethnographies	Ian Cook & Phil Crang	1995	ISBN 1-87246-408-4	
59	Area Cartograms: Their Use and Creation	Daniel Dorling	1996	ISBN 1-872464-09-2	

== See also ==
- Geographia Generalis
- Geographic Information Science and Technology Body of Knowledge
- How to Lie with Maps
