= Philip Crang =

British cultural and human geographer

Philip Andrew Crang is a British cultural and human geographer. Since 2005, he has been Professor of Cultural Geography at Royal Holloway, University of London, and is a Fellow of the Academy of Social Sciences.

== Life ==
=== Education and career ===
Crang completed his undergraduate degree at Emmanuel College, Cambridge, graduating with a BA in 1986. He remained at the University of Cambridge to carry out his doctoral studies; his PhD was awarded in 1992 for his thesis "'A new service society?': On the geographies of service employment". After finishing his doctorate, Crang lectured at St David's College, Lampeter, and later moved to University College London, where he was Lecturer in Human Geography. He moved to Royal Holloway, University of London, in 2000 and took up the post of Reader in Human Geography. He was promoted to Professor of Cultural Geography in 2005.

=== Honours and awards ===
In October 2012, Crang was elected an Academician of the Academy of Social Sciences (later renamed Fellow of the Academy of Social Sciences).

== Publications ==
- (Edited with Mike Crang and Jon May) Virtual Geographies: Bodies, Space, Relations (Routledge, 1999).
- (Edited with Mark Goodwin and Paul Cloke) Introducing Human Geographies (Hodder Headline, 1999).
- (Edited with Peter Jackson and Claire Dwyer) Transnational Spaces (Routledge, 2004).
- (Co-authored with Chris Philo, Ian Cook, Joe Painter, Mark Goodwin, Paul Cloke) Practising Human Geography (Sage, 2004).
- (Co-edited with Paul Cloke and Mark Goodwin) Envisioning Human Geographies (Hodder Headline, 2004).
- (Co-authored with Christopher Breward and Rosemary Crill) British Asian Style: Fashion & Textiles: Past & Present (V&A Publishing, 2010).
