= London Metropolitan University =

University in London, England

Coordinates: 51.551574°N 0.110687°W

- Coat of arms of the university
- Former names: University of North London, London Guildhall University, City of London Polytechnic, Polytechnic of North London, Northern Polytechnic Institute, North-Western Polytechnic, City of London College, Sir John Cass College of Arts and Science
- Motto: Knowledge in Abundance
- Type: Public
- Established: 1 August 2002 (origins from 1848; amalgation of UNL and LGU)
- Affiliations: ACU; EUA; IAAPS; MillionPlus; Universities UK
- Endowment: £0.25 million (2022)
- Budget: £122.5 million (2021/22)
- Vice-Chancellor: Julie Hall
- Academic staff: 2,400 (academic & admin)
- Students: 13,665 (2024/25)
- Undergraduates: 10,030 (2024/25)
- Postgraduates: 3,635 (2024/25)
- Location: London, England
- Campus: Holloway and Aldgate
- London Underground Station: Holloway Road; Aldgate East
- Colours: Purple, grey
- Nickname: London Met
- Website: londonmet.ac.uk
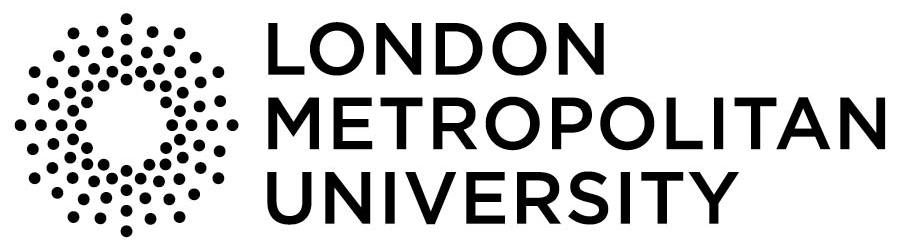

London Metropolitan University (abbreviated as London Met) is a public research university in London, England. The University of North London and London Guildhall University merged in 2002 to create the university. The University's roots can be traced back to 1848.

The university has campuses in the City of London and in the London Borough of Islington, a museum, archives and libraries. Special collections include the TUC Library, the Irish Studies Collection and the Frederick Parker Collection.

== History ==
London Metropolitan University was formed on 1 August 2002 by the merger of London Guildhall University and the University of North London. In October 2006, the University opened a new Science Centre as part of a £30m investment in its science department at the North campus on Holloway Road, with a "Super Lab" claimed to be one of Europe's most advanced science teaching facilities, and 280 workstations equipped with digital audio visual interactive equipment.

=== London Guildhall University ===
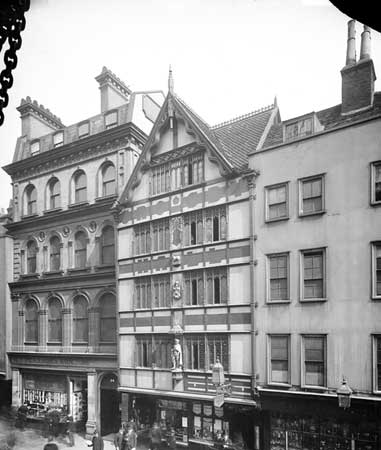
Crosby Hall, Bishopsgate, where the Metropolitan Evening Classes for Young Men started in 1848

In 1848, Charles James Blomfield, the Bishop of London, called upon the clergy to establish evening classes to improve the moral, intellectual and spiritual condition of young men in London. In response, the bishop Charles Mackenzie, instituted the Metropolitan Evening Classes for Young Men in Crosby Hall, Bishopsgate, London, with student fees at one shilling per session. Subjects on the original curriculum included Greek, Latin, Hebrew, English, History, Mathematics, Drawing and Natural Philosophy. This fledgling college came under royal patronage following the visit of Prince Albert to the classes in 1851. In 1860, the classes moved to Sussex Hall, the former Livery Hall of the Bricklayers' Company, in Leadenhall Street. By this time, some 800 students were enrolled annually.

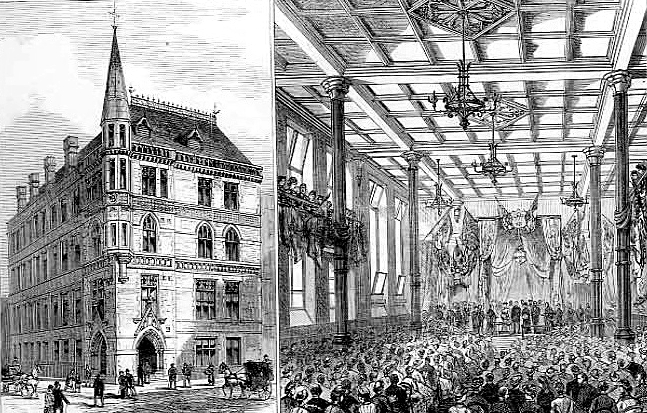
City of London College's new building at Moorfields in 1883 opened by the then Prince of Wales

In 1861, the classes were reconstituted and named the City of London College. Over the next twenty years, the College was one of the pioneers in the introduction of commercial and technical subjects. The college built new premises in White Street at a cost of £16,000 (contributions were received from Queen Victoria and the Prince of Wales) and were opened in 1881. In 1891, the college joined Birkbeck Institute and the Northampton Institute to form the City Polytechnic by a Charity Commissioners' scheme to facilitate funding for these institutions by the City Parochial Foundation, and to enable the three institutions to work cooperatively. However this attempted federation did not function in practice, as each institution continued to operate more or less independently. The City Polytechnic concept was dissolved in 1906 and the City of London College came under the supervision of London County Council.

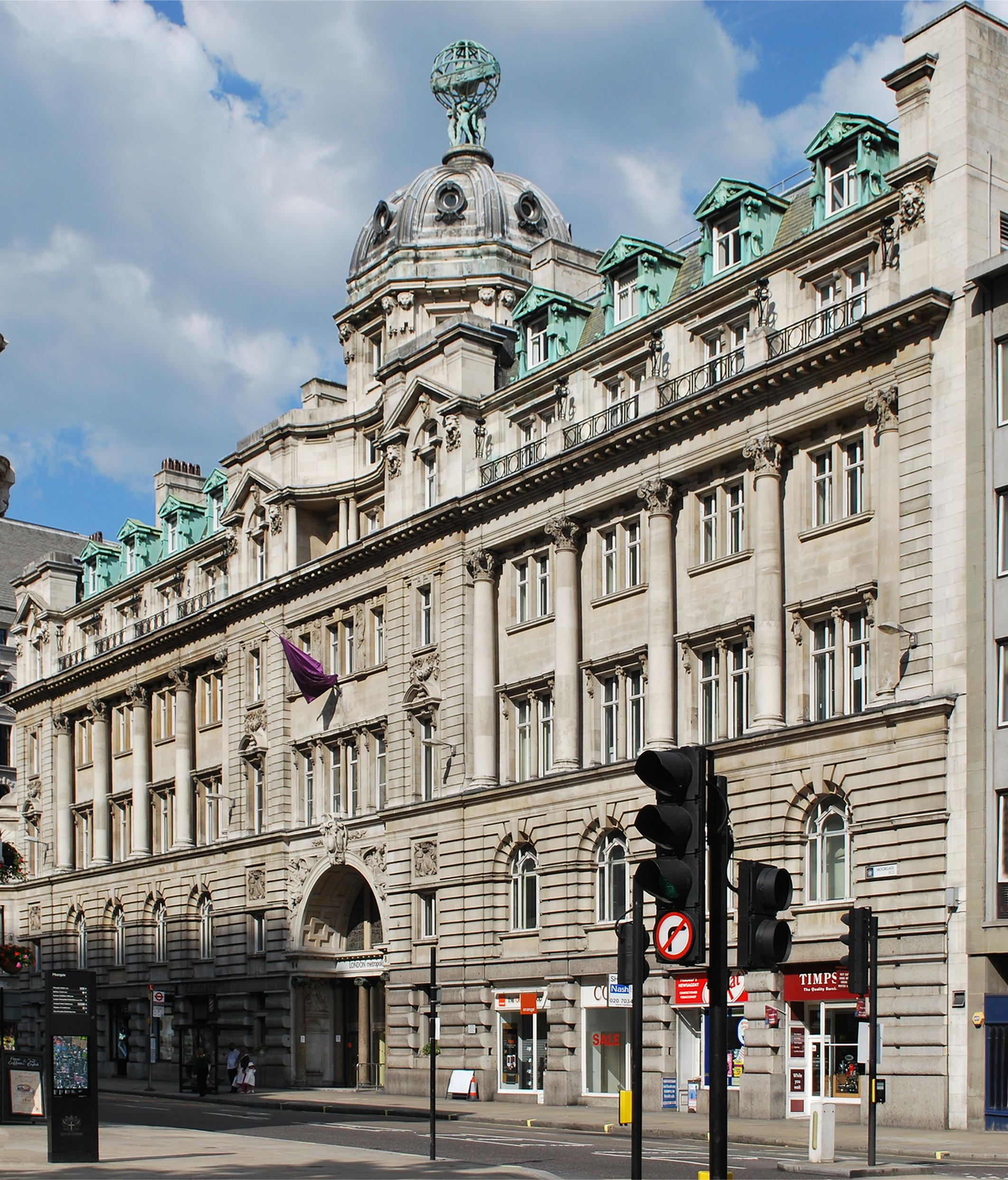
Electra House, 84 Moorgate, built by John Belcher in 1902, topped by a sculpture of young Atlases supporting a zodiacal globe by F.W. Pomeroy.

In December 1940, the college's building was destroyed by a German air raid. City of London College subsequently moved into premises at 84 Moorgate in 1944. In 1948, the City of London College celebrated its centenary with a service of thanksgiving addressed by the Archbishop of Canterbury at St Paul's Cathedral. In 1970 the college merged with Sir John Cass College to form the City of London Polytechnic. In 1977, it also became the home of the Fawcett Society library, afterwards the Women's Library.

Under the Further and Higher Education Act 1992 the Polytechnic was awarded university status (having previously awarded degrees of the Council for National Academic Awards). It was renamed London Guildhall University, to demonstrate its links with the City of London and the City's many guilds/livery companies. It was unassociated with the Guildhall School of Music and Drama, based at the Barbican Centre. It was ranked 30th out of the UK's 43 new universities in the 2001 Research Assessment Exercise. In August 2004, in the midst of a contract dispute with former LGU staff following the merger with the University of North London, it was reported that the management of the merged institution had ordered the destruction of the entire print run of a history of the university – London Guildhall University: From Polytechnic to University – authored by Sean Glynn, formerly a senior research fellow in the department of Politics and Modern History; the work had been commissioned by Sir Roderick Floud, the President of London Metropolitan University, when Provost of LGU.

The former LGU campus, which was home to London Met's Guildhall School of Business and Law until August 2019, was located at the intersection of the City of London financial district and the old East End, near Aldgate East, Tower Hill and Liverpool Street tube stations. There are buildings located at Minories, Jewry Street, Central House, Moorgate, Whitechapel High Street, Calcutta House, Commercial Road and Goulston Street. There is a gymnasium for the use of staff and students at the Whitechapel High St. building,

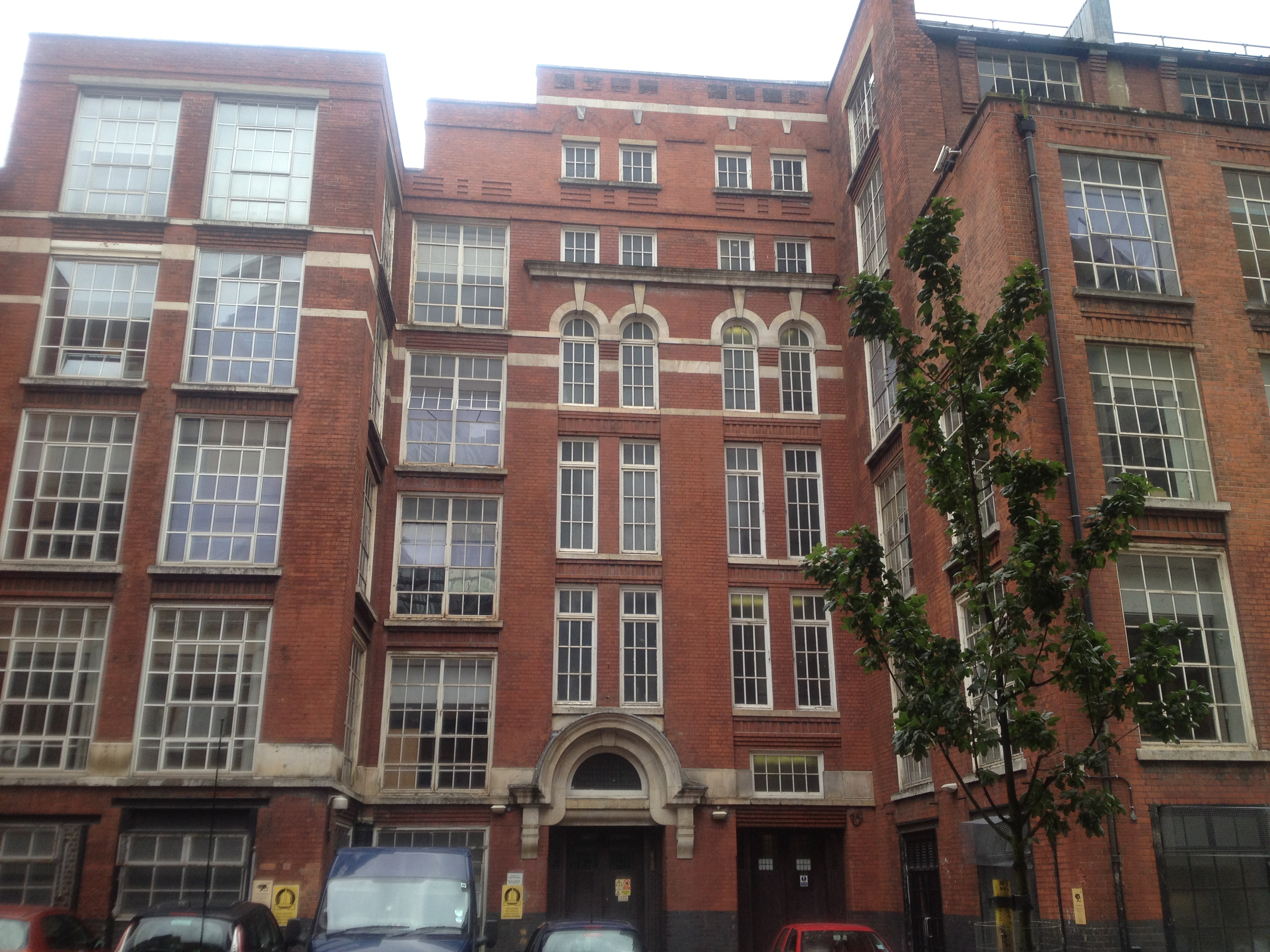
Calcutta House which was named after the Indian port of Calcutta

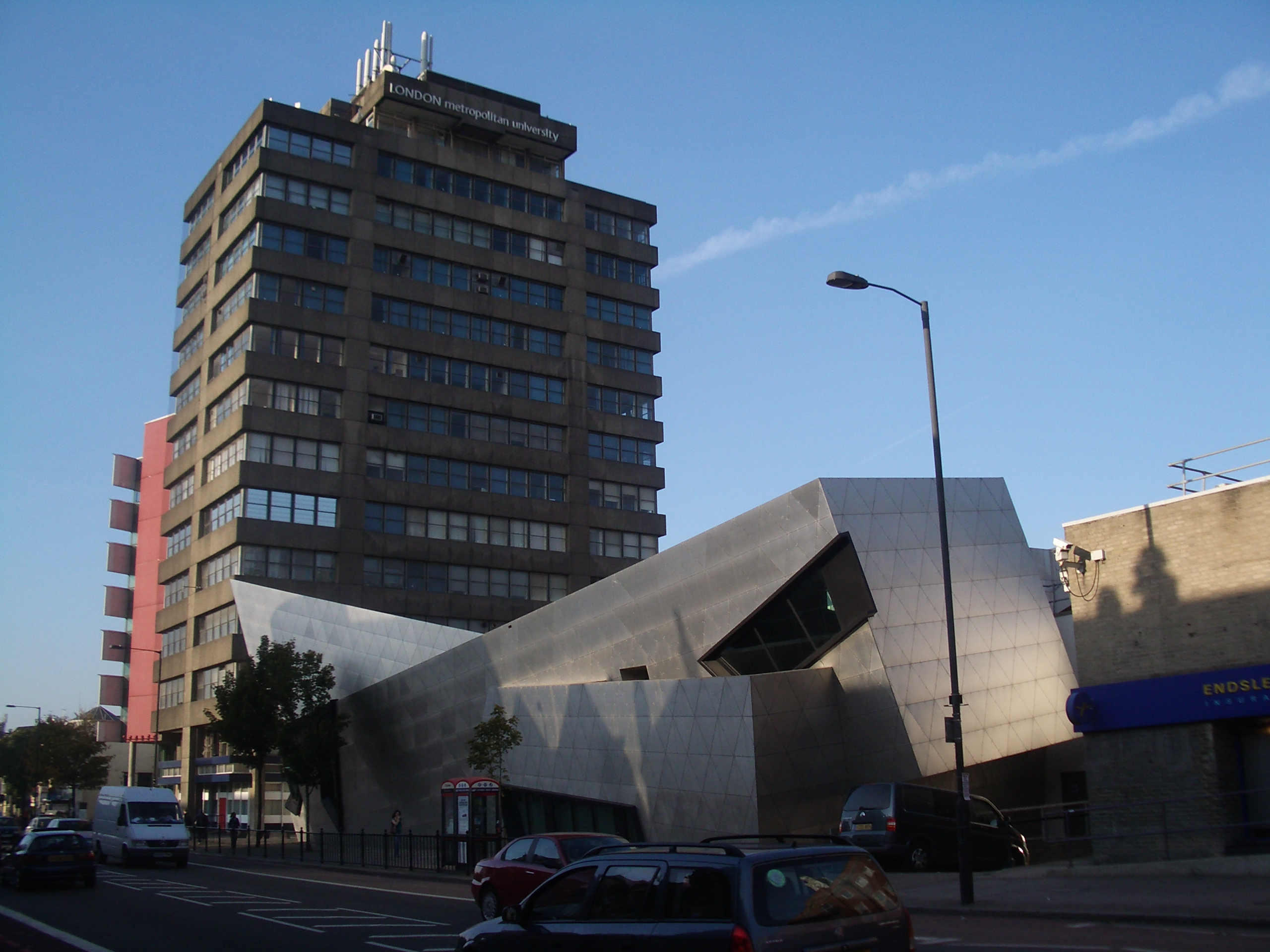
The Tower Building with the deconstructivist Graduate Centre designed by Daniel Libeskind

=== University of North London ===
Founded as the Northern Polytechnic Institute in 1896, it merged in 1971 with the North Western Polytechnic which was established in 1929, to become the Polytechnic of North London. Until the passing of the Education Reform Act 1988, the Polytechnic was under the control of the Inner London Education Authority – part of the then Greater London Council and awarded the degrees of the former Council for National Academic Awards. Under the Further and Higher Education Act 1992, the institution, a pioneer of widening participation and access to higher education, was granted university status and the right to award its own degrees. Following the merger with London Guildhall University, London Metropolitan University became the largest unitary university in Greater London.

The former UNL campus is now the Holloway campus and is located on Holloway Road, near Holloway Road and Highbury & Islington tube stations.

=== Dalai Lama Honorary Doctorate controversy ===
In May 2008, London Metropolitan University presented the 14th Dalai Lama with an Honorary Doctorate of Philosophy, for "promoting peace globally". This move caused controversy among the Chinese public and the overseas Chinese community, who view the Dalai Lama as partly responsible for the 2008 unrest in Tibet. As a result, Chinese migration agents had been reported to "boycott" London Metropolitan University in advising clients who wish to study in the UK. The university's Vice-Chancellor, Brian Roper, in July sent a controversial public letter of apology to the Chinese Foreign Ministry via embassy officials. In an interview with the Global Times, a worker at a Chinese study abroad agency suggested that the university could repair the offence of the honours by refusing speaking platforms to Tibetan independence groups, such as the university's own "Free Tibet Society". The university has also faced criticism for offering free scholarships specifically reserved for students from the Tibetan exile community in India, Nepal and the West, in a case of non-merit "racial quotas".

=== Student numbers controversy ===
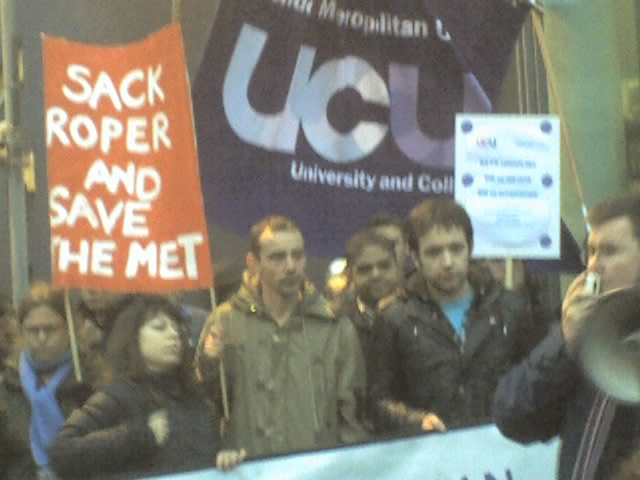
A demonstration against job cuts in Jan 2009

In July 2008, it was reported that a financial crisis was looming for the university. London Met had allegedly been misreporting data on student drop-outs for several years and, consequently, the Higher Education Funding Council for England (HEFCE) was proposing to reclaim at least £15 million for the overpayment in 2008–9. In February 2009 the overpayment figure was revised to £56 million by HEFCE, who were seeking to recover the money.

On 19 March 2009, in response to the crisis, vice-chancellor Brian Roper resigned his position with immediate effect but continued to receive his salary until December 2009. In May 2009, Alfred Morris, former vice-chancellor of the University of the West of England and University of Wales, Lampeter, was appointed interim vice-chancellor.

The government announced in May 2009 that there would be an independent inquiry, exploring the possibility that HEFCE had colluded with London Met by failing to query implausibly low drop-out rates. The inquiry concluded in November 2009 and was reported to attribute responsibility to vice-chancellor Brian Roper, along with other senior administrators and the Board of Governors. Following completion of the report, the chair of HEFCE called on "senior staff" and the entire Board of Governors to resign, noting that HEFCE was not convinced that the university's management could effectively safeguard public funds. After the deadline indicated by HEFCE chief executive Alan Langlands had expired, rumours circulated among staff and government ministers that HEFCE could withdraw funding, effectively forcing the university to close.

A report commissioned by the university, published in November 2009, found that vice-chancellor Roper bore "the major responsibility and culpability" for the financial situation: Roper and some members of the executive had been aware that the university had been applying its own interpretation of funding rules on student drop-outs – rather than the funding council's – since 2003, but had taken no action. The university's board of governors and audit committee had an oversight role, which made them ultimately "accountable for a financial failure of this magnitude" and this meant that they "must take overall responsibility".

=== 2011 course changes ===
In early 2011, London Metropolitan University announced an overhaul of undergraduate education for students entering courses in 2012. This included a reduction in the number of courses from 557 to 160. The announcement also signalled a move from semester-long to year-long modules, and thirty weeks of teaching, a gain of six weeks on the current average. The university argues that the longer learning time will help increase the opportunity for development and guidance before students move to final examinations. There will be a transition to this new course offering in 2011/12 and this has led to applicants for some courses being contacted and offered alternative programmes.

=== Proposed alcohol-free zones ===
In April 2012, Professor Malcolm Gillies, Vice-Chancellor and Chief Executive, was reported to be considering creating alcohol-free zones and events to enable Muslim students (who form 20% of the student population) to take part more comfortably. This provoked criticism from the Muslim Council of Britain and the university's Islamic societies, who described the proposal as unhelpful and "divisive", but positive comments from representatives of the National Union of Students and the Federation of Student Islamic Societies.

=== UK Home Office/Border Agency action, and consequences ===
On 16 July 2012, the UK Border Agency of the Home Office suspended the university's "highly-trusted status" with the Border Agency, a status required in order for the university to be eligible to sponsor both new student visa applications as well as existing student visas, for foreign students from outside of the European Union and the European Economic Area (or Switzerland). The university was one of three institutions to have such a status suspended.

On 30 August 2012, the university's highly trusted status was revoked, revoking the university's right to sponsor new visa applications for non-EU/EEA foreign students, as well as revoking the existing visas of the university's pre-existing non-European foreign students, causing them to be excluded from the university, and leaving thousands with the possibility of being forced to leave the country, unless places with alternative institutions and sponsors are secured.

The Immigration Minister, Damian Green, cited a number of reasons for the decision, including the discovery that more than a quarter of the students in the test sample did not in fact have leave to remain in the UK, that the university did not have and could not provide sufficient proof of English-language proficiency standards for some of its students, and the fact that the university was unable to confirm the attendance of its students, in some 57% of the sampled cases.

In September 2012, the university announced it was beginning legal action against the border agency over the licence issue.

In April 2013, the university regained its licence to sponsor international students for Tier 4 visas.

The High Court case against Home Office was settled in October 2013 after both parties reached an undisclosed settlement. Both parties have refused to comment on the specifics of the settlement. The last minute withdrawal of the case meant that the judicial review against the Home Office, which had been scheduled to start on 17 October 2013, would not proceed any further.

In November 2019, London Metropolitan University released a statement confirmed that University Patron Prince Andrew, Duke of York had resigned.

== Campuses ==
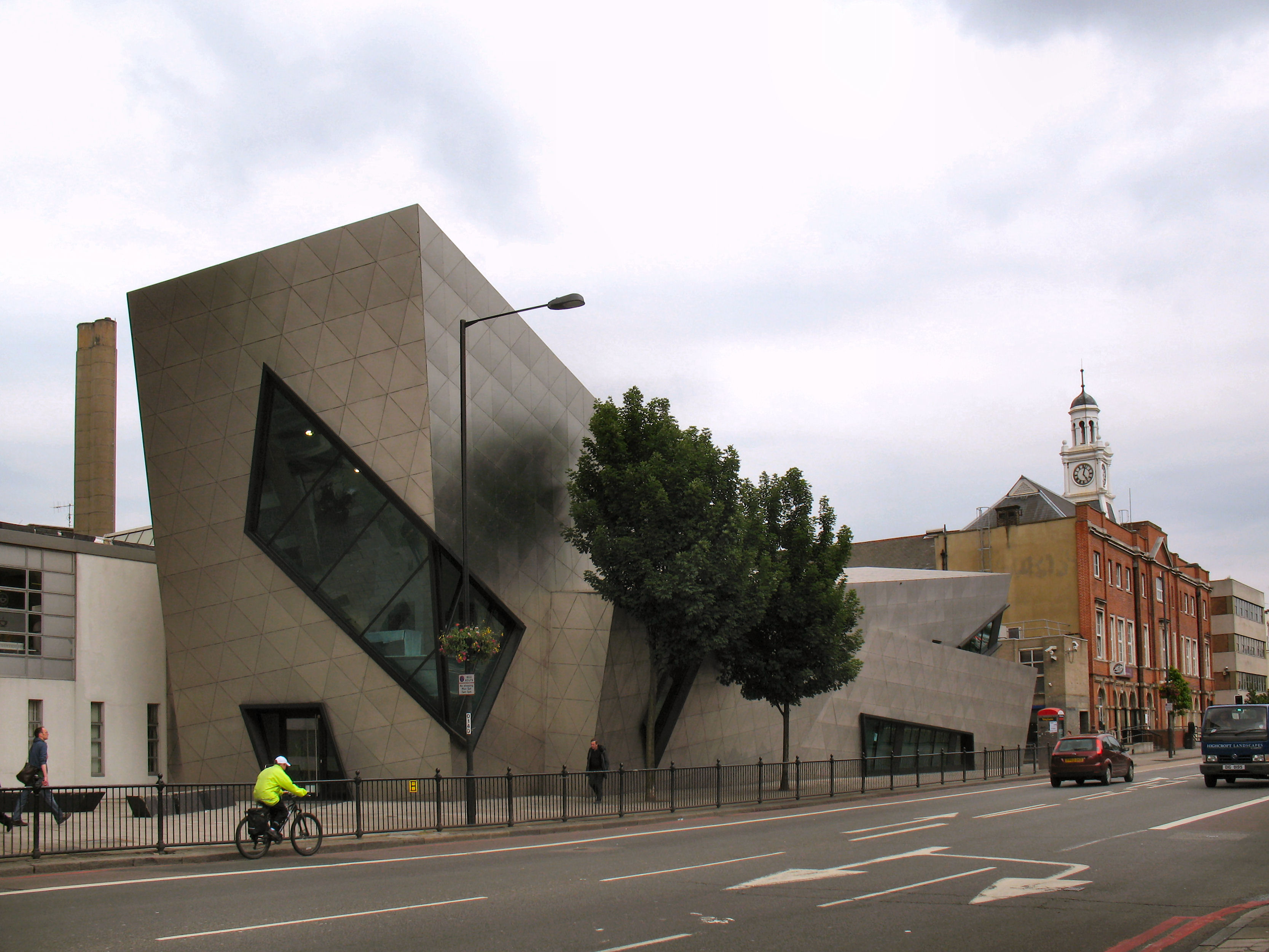
The Graduate Centre and the Clock Tower Building

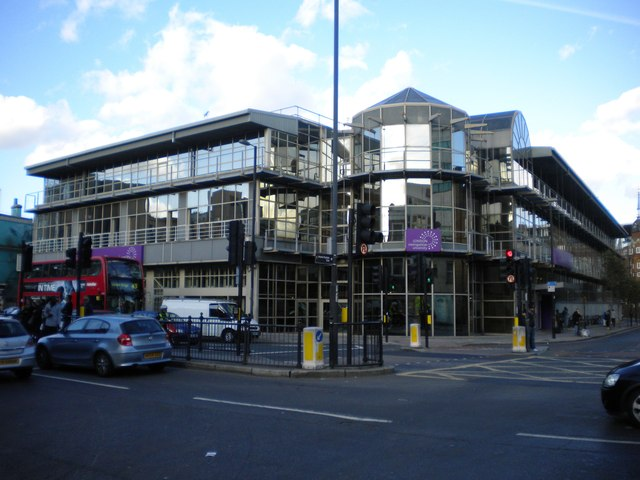
The Learning Centre which houses the North Campus Library

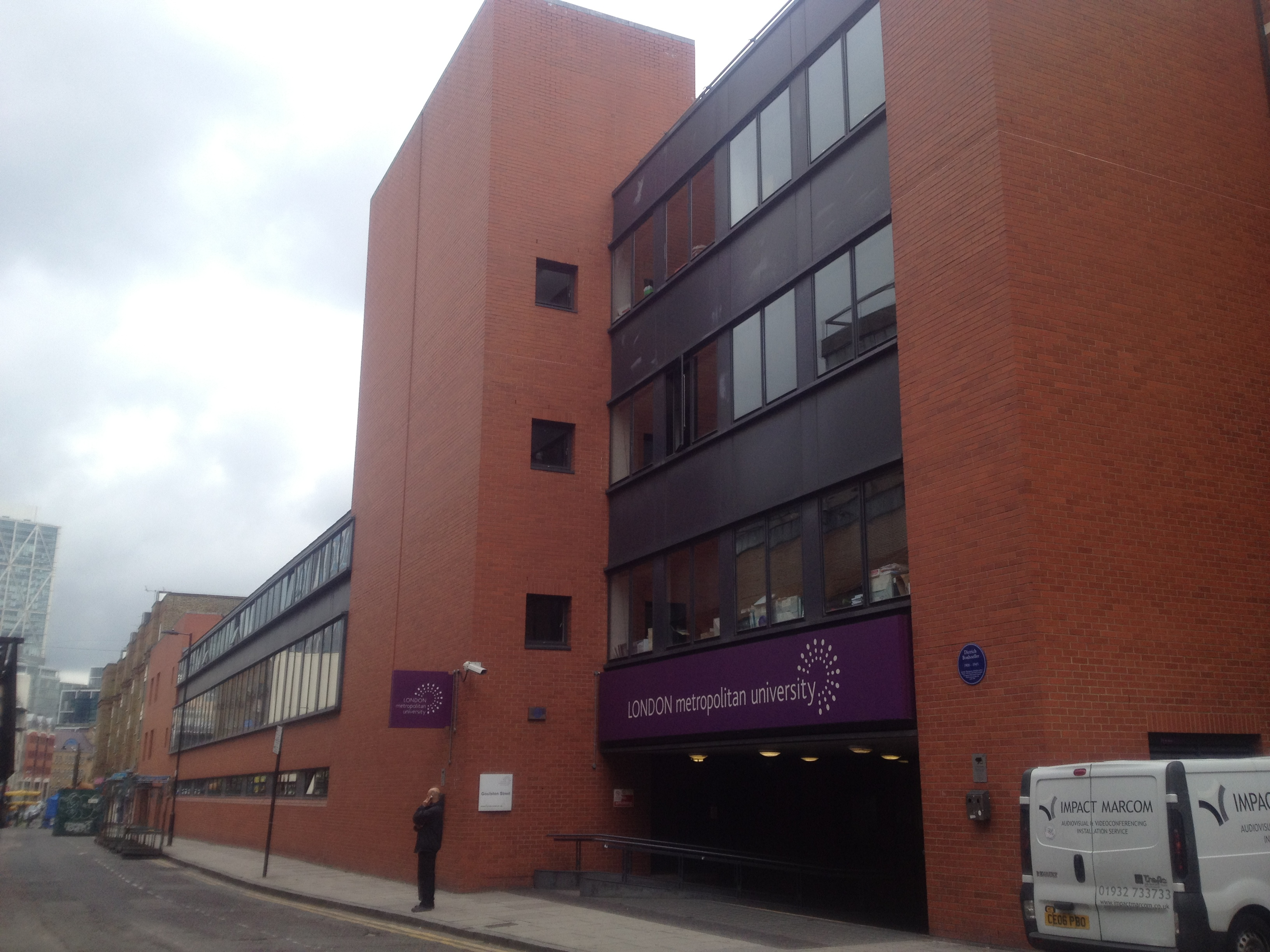
Law Building at Goulston Street, City Campus

The main university campus is on Holloway Road in the London Borough of Islington where five of the University's Schools are based. The School of Art, Architecture and Design is based in Aldgate.

== Academic profile ==
London Metropolitan offers about 160 degree courses, to 10,390 students (including 7,000 overseas students from 155 countries). The university also maintains several offices abroad in Beijing, Chennai, Delhi, Dhaka, Lagos and Lahore. The university's operations are overseen by a board of governors comprising external members and senior administrative and academic staff.

=== Academic departments ===
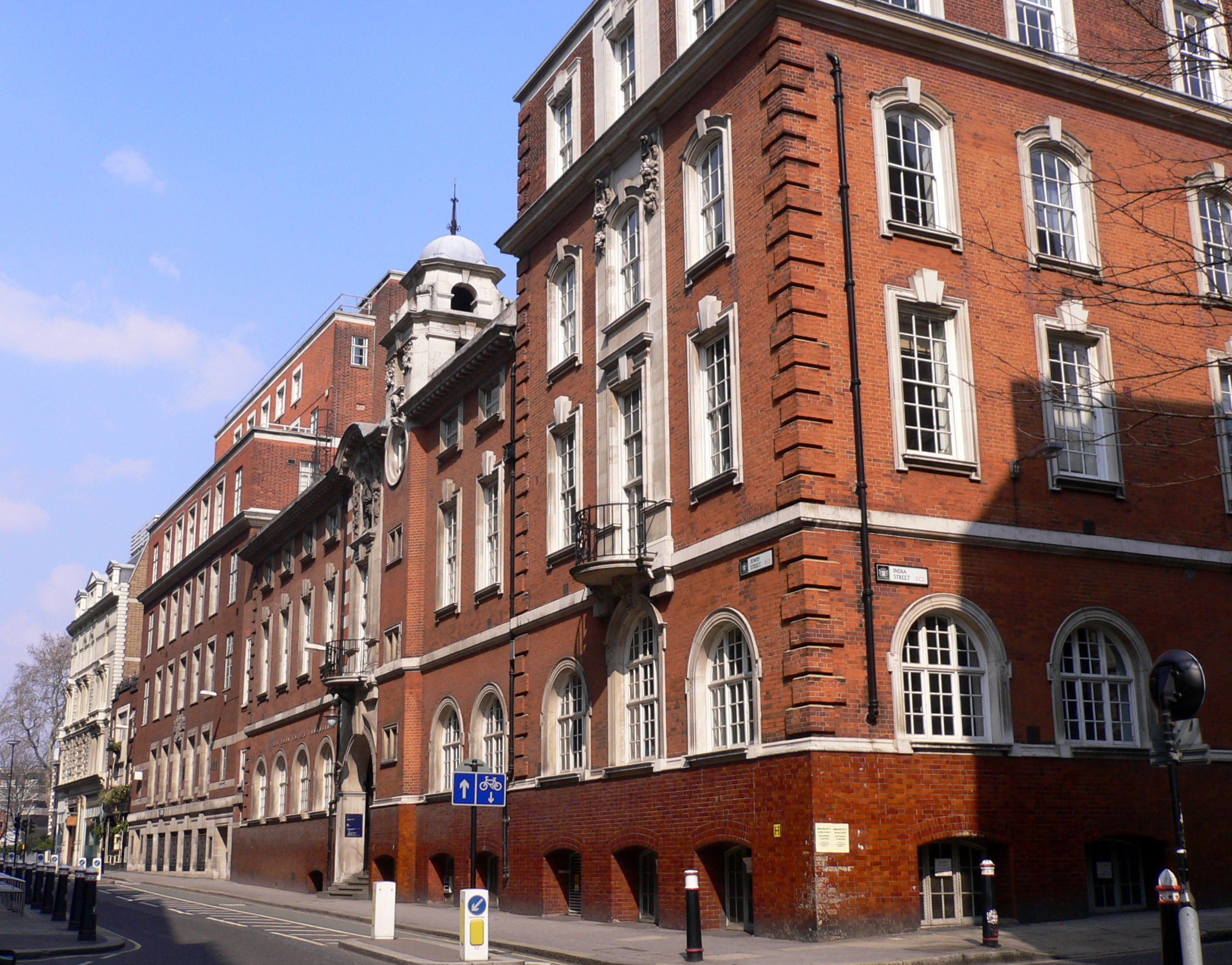
The former Sir John Cass College site at 31 Jewry Street. The Sir John Cass Foundation offices are on the premises which are leased to the university by the Foundation.

The University's academic departments are currently arranged into five schools, where previously there were four faculties each comprising three schools. These are:

- School of Business, Environment and Law
- School of Computing and Digital Media
- School of Human Sciences
- School of Social Sciences and Professions
- School of Art, Architecture and Design

=== Scholarships ===
The university invests more than £700,000 annually in its scholarship programme to help academically excellent students as well as students with outstanding achievements in various sports disciplines, such as hockey, tennis and basketball. The university gives £1000 for any of its undergraduate international students who achieve "A" grade marks. The university also offers postgraduate scholarships, a range of full tuition scholarships, including some scholarships with free accommodation. Scholarships are offered in conjunction the BBC World Service, International Student House and Mahatma Gandhi Foundation. The university has several student exchange programmes with academic institutions in the US and Europe, with financial support for those who participate through the Erasmus programme.

=== Rankings and reputation ===
Rankings
National rankings
- Complete (2027): 129
- Guardian (2027): 89
- Times / Sunday Times (2027): 124

Global rankings
- QS (2027): 1001–1200
- THE (2026): 601–800

In the past, the university refused to participate in newspaper league tables on the grounds that Universities should be assessed by the UK Government and not (private) newspapers. The new management reversed this policy and in the 2013 rankings (published in 2012), the university was placed 118th out of 120 universities in The Guardian University Guide 2013. In the 2011 Institutional Audit, the Quality Assurance Agency expressed "reasonable confidence" in the "academic standards" of the university's awards. In the 2008 Research Assessment Exercise, London Metropolitan was ranked equal 107th out of 132 institutions by the Times Higher Education's RAE league table. The university has not fared well in the past national league tables (2014/2015) and has placed last in each respective league table, Guardian University Guide 2015 (116th), Complete University Guide 2015 (123rd) and The Times and Sunday Times University League Table 2014 (121st). The university has fared better in the most recent Guardian University Guide 2024 (85th).

The architecture department was ranked 18th and 20th in 2011 and 2012 in The Guardian University League Tables. American Studies placed 20th, 17th and 18th in 2011, 2012 and more recently, at the newly published Complete University Guide 2013. The law school ranked 87th in 2011 at the Complete University Guide and rose to 85th in 2012, 75th in 2013 and most recently placed 70th out of 98 law schools at the 2014 Complete University Guide. It is also ranked 58th out of 96 in Research Assessment. The School of Art, Architecture and Design (fashion, textile and retail design courses) was ranked 4th in The Guardian University League Tables 2022.

The university also entered the QS World University Rankings (2022) of top universities in the world for the first time, placing in the 801-1000 bracket.

== Student life ==
=== Students' union ===

London Metropolitan University Students' Union (MetSU) is the students' union for students at London Metropolitan University. It provides representation, advice and support to students at the university. MetSU is run by four full-time sabbatical officers and four part-time liberation officers.

MetSU has two offices, one at its City Campus at CM2-22 Calcutta House, Old Castle Street and on the North Campus at the Harglenis Building, 166–220 Holloway Road.

=== Student media ===
Student media at London Metropolitan University include:

- Verve magazine – launched in 2009 by journalism students; articles about the university, general politics, entertainment, lifestyle, fashion and sports.
- Verve Radio – launched in 2011 as a platform for student thoughts and opinions; regular shows hosted by student DJs.
- Dictum – launched in 2010 by law students; articles on law, politics and international relations; notable guest writers include Supreme Court Judge Robert Walker and writer, blogger and barrister Tim Kevan.

== Notable people ==
=== Notable alumni ===
==== Arts and media ====
- Josy Anne, Nigerian media personality
- Helen Baker, author
- John Box, Academy Award and BAFTA-winning British film production designer and art director
- Noel Clarke, director, screenwriter and actor
- Alannah Currie, artist
- Chunkz, YouTuber (dropped out)
- James Hyman, DJ, Radio & TV presenter, music supervisor and MD of JLH.
- Yinka Ilori, an artist and designer
- Henry Irving, first English Stage actor to be awarded a knighthood
- Jepchumba, Kenyan artist
- Will Kirk, furniture restorer, The Repair Shop
- Jon Klein, post-punk guitarist for Siouxsie and the Banshees
- J. W. R. Linton, West Australian artist and teacher
- Maimie McCoy, actress
- Tom McRae, English singer-songwriter
- Alison Moyet, pop singer
- Michael Petry, multi-media artist, director of MOCA London, and co-founder of the Museum of Installation, London
- Vic Reeves, comedian
- Daniela Ruah, actress, most notably NCIS: Los Angeles
- Edwin Smith, photographer
- Adaora Onyechere, a Nigerian TV/radio presenter, entrepreneur, motivational speaker and author.
- Irwin Sparkes, front-man of pop band The Hoosiers
- Matthew Sweeney, Irish poet
- Neil Tennant, from the Pet Shop Boys (1972–75 History, North London Polytechnic)
- AJ Tracey, Musician (dropped out)
- Jamie Theakston, TV presenter
- Eamonn Walker, English film, television and theatre actor
- Oritsé Williams, member of pop band JLS (did not graduate)
- Tracey Emin, English Artist, was awarded a Doctor of Philosophy from London Metropolitan University
- Xatar, German Rapper and Record Label Executive (did not graduate)

==== Business, marketing and law ====
- Ian M. Cook, Chairman, President and chief executive officer of Colgate-Palmolive.
- Harry Henry, one of Britain's market research pioneers and last survivor of the 23 founders of the Market Research Society (MRS)
- Nick Leeson, trader with Barings Bank who brought about its collapse
- Jane Shepherdson, chief executive of UK clothing brand, Whistles and was brand director for TopShop.

==== Politics and public affairs ====
- Barbara Allimadi, Ugandan politician and human rights activist
- Adel Al-Mouwdah, Deputy Speaker of Bahrain's first elected parliament and president of Salafist party, Asalah
- Graham Allen, Member of Parliament (1974, City of London Polytechnic)
- Candy Atherton, British journalist and former Member of Parliament (1985, BA Applied Social Studies, Polytechnic of North London)
- Julie Bindel, English writer, feminist and co-founder of the group Justice For Women (Researcher)
- James Brokenshire, Member of Parliament
- Jeremy Corbyn, former leader of the Labour Party (Trade Union Studies, North London Polytechnic: did not graduate)
- Marie-Claire Faray, women's rights activist, Vice President of the UK chapter of the Women's International League for Peace and Freedom
- Kate Hoey, Member of Parliament (Economics, City of London College)
- Sadiq Khan, Member of Parliament and Mayor of London (1992, Law, University of North London)
- Nainendra Nand, former Solicitor-General of Fiji from 1997 to 2000
- Christine Russell, former Member of Parliament
- David Shaw, former Member of Parliament
- Rainatou Sow, women's rights campaigner
- Peter Tatchell, human rights campaigner (1973, BSc Sociology, Polytechnic of North London)
- Pola Uddin, Baroness Uddin, Labour politician and community activist
- Charlie Whelan, Gordon Brown's former spin doctor
- Malcolm Wicks, Member of Parliament
- Nnamdi Kanu, Nigerian-British Director of Radio Biafra and founder of Indigenous People of Biafra (IPOB), an African separatist group

==== Royalty ====
- Otumfuo Nana Osei Tutu II, King of the Ashantiman in Ghana, attended the Polytechnic of North London

==== Sciences ====
- D. Bernard Amos, professor of immunology and experimental surgery at Duke University (1962–1993), attended Sir John Cass Technical School
- Harshad Bhadeshia, professor of metallurgy at the University of Cambridge, attended City of London Polytechnic
- Edward Charles Bowra, Sinologist and botanist, attended City of London College
- Edward Robert Harrison, astronomer and cosmologist noted for his explanation of Olbers's paradox

==== Sports ====
- David Goodchild, former English cricketer

=== Notable staff ===
- Patrick Brill, artist
- Maurice Glasman, Lord Glasman
- Peter Gowan, left-wing intellectual and editor of New Left Review
- Stephen Haseler, politician and writer
- Sadiq Khan, Member of Parliament and Mayor of London
- Tony McNulty, former Member of Parliament
- Karim Ouazzane, Professor of Computing and Knowledge Exchange
- Sunny Singh, writer
- Paul St George, artist
- Kate Soper, philosopher
- Margot Sunderland, children's psychologist and author of popular books
- A. J. P. Taylor, historian
- Nicholas Troop, health psychologist

== See also ==
- Armorial of UK universities
- List of universities in the UK
- Post-1992 universities
