= Journal of Rural Studies =

- Discipline: Area studies
- Language: English
- Edited by: Darren Smith

Publication details
- History: 1985–present
- Publisher: Elsevier
- Frequency: 8/year
- Impact factor: 5.1 (2023)

Standard abbreviations
- ISO 4: J. Rural Stud.

Indexing
- CODEN: JRSTFW
- ISSN: 0743-0167
- LCCN: 85642224
- OCLC no.: 950512886

Links
- Journal homepage; Online archive

The Journal of Rural Studies is a peer reviewed academic journal published by Elsevier (originally Pergamon Press). It covers research on present-day rural societies, as well as their economies, cultures, and lifestyles. This includes rural geography and agricultural economics. Paul Cloke was the founding editor-in-chief.

== Abstracting and indexing ==
The journal is abstracted and indexed in:

- Current Contents
- GEOBASE
- Scopus
- Social Sciences Citation Index

According to the Journal Citation Reports, the journal has a 2023 impact factor of 5.1.
