= Vanuatu Mobile Forces =

Paramilitary police force

- Flag of Vanuatu Mobile Forces
- Active: 1980; 46 years ago
- Country: Vanuatu
- Agency: Vanuatu Police Force

Commanders
- Current commander: Colonel Astrophile Mwele

Website
- Vanuatu Mobile Force

The Vanuatu Mobile Forces (VMF) is the paramilitary wing of the Vanuatu Police Force. A small, mobile corps of 300 personnel equipped with small arms, should Vanuatu be attacked, the VMF will act as the first line of defence.

== History ==
In 1994, VMF deployed 50 officers to Papua New Guinea, as their first peacekeeping mission.

Though the armed forces in Vanuatu have never overthrown a government, members of the VMF angry about their pay detained President Jean-Marie Léyé and Deputy Prime Minister Barak Sopé on October 12, 1996 but released them just a few hours later.

== List of commanders ==
- Colonel Ian Arthur Naunton Cook (1980–1984)
- Sato Kilman (1984–1986)
- James Aru (?–?)
- Colonel Seule Takal (? - 1996 - ?)
- Lieutenant Colonel Harold Thompson (? - 1999 - ?)
- Lieutenant Colonel Apie Jack Mari Kempo (? - 2002 - ?)
- Joshua Bong (? - 2004)
- Lieutenant Colonel Willie Vira (2004–2010)
- Lieutenant Colonel Aru Maralau (2010–?)
- Lieutenant Colonel Job Esau (?–2015)
- Colonel Robson Iavro (2015–22 October 2019)
- Lieutenant Colonel Kalshem Bongran (22 October 2019–?) acting
- Colonel Astrophile Mwele (?-present)

== Equipment ==
Infantry weapons

Name	Image	Origin	Type	Notes
Beretta 92		Italy	Semi-automatic pistol	Standard sidearm
Sterling submachine gun		United Kingdom	Submachine gun	
FAMAS		France	Assault rifle	Standard issue
L1A1 SLR		United Kingdom	Battle rifle	Used in training
