= Brian Roper (economist) =

Brian Roper (born 15 December 1949) is a British economist and former vice-chancellor of London Metropolitan University.

== Career ==
Roper was born and raised in southeast London, and studied economics at the University of Wales. After a stint at Unilever he studied for a master's degree at the University of Manchester.

In 1980s Roper held a number of administrative posts at the Newcastle Polytechnic, including the Head of the School of Economics, the Head of the Faculty of Professional Studies and assistant director. Roper then moved to Oxford Polytechnic (renamed in 1992 into Oxford Brookes University) to take up the deputy director post there. He later served as Deputy Vice-Chancellor for Academic Affairs.

In early 1994 Roper moved to the University of North London to become Vice-Chancellor there. He remained at that post until the 2002 merger of North London with London Guildhall University, which produced the London Metropolitan University.

=== London Metropolitan University ===
After the merger Roderick Floud was appointed as the vice-chancellor and chief academic officer and Brian Roper appointed as the chief executive and accounting officer. Effective 1 April 2004, Brian Roper became the Vice-Chancellor of London Metropolitan University, with Roderick Floud becoming the university's president. His salary for 2006-7 was £276,000 before bonuses, making him the highest paid vice-chancellor in the country. Since the formation of London Met he caused controversy due to the receipt of large pay increases. In February 2005 the Times Higher Education reported that he was the "biggest winner" among V-Cs over the past decade, having seen a 124% increase in his salary. It also noted that his pay rise from 2003 to 2004 occurred at a time when the university was seeking job cuts "because the institution has failed to meet internal financial targets".

=== Role in London Met financial crisis ===
In 2009 Roper resigned his position as London Metropolitan's Vice-Chancellor in the wake of a financial crisis at the university that followed from submission of inaccurate data on its drop-out rate, resulting in overpayments of government support. One report commissioned by the university 18 months after his departure found that Roper had "the major responsibility and culpability" for the financial situation: It alleged that Roper and some members of the executive were aware that the university had been applying its own interpretation of funding rules on student drop-outs – rather than the funding council's – since 2003, but took no action. The university's board of governors and audit committee had an oversight role, which made them ultimately "accountable for a financial failure of this magnitude" and meant that they "must take overall responsibility". A subsequent report was however commissioned by the university to "institute an investigation into the role of the senior staff mentioned in the Melville and Deloitte reports". The conclusion of that report by the law firm Eversheds was that "We have seen no evidence that there was any attempt or collusion to manipulate the student records system or to code the software running the system to maximise the number of completions returned to HESES or HESA. We believe the systems were set up in a way that maximised the returns by accident with no thought given to the mismatch of completion and progression definitions between HEFCE and the University in its academic regulations and the impact of that on the coding of the student record systems or the submission of the HESES or HESA returns". (https://web.archive.org/web/20120502013013/http://www.londonmet.ac.uk/fms/MRSite/psd/secretarys-office/FOI-Classes/DELOITTES-1.pdf).

== Views ==
In 1997 Roper was a vocal opponent of the government's plans to increase student tuition fees, arguing that such a move would significantly reduce university enrolment by low-income students. He also spoke against the use of A-levels as the sole screening test in university admissions, arguing that the students' background and social circumstances must also be taken into account.

During his service as the London Metropolitan's Vice-Chancellor, Roper was involved in a series of contentious battles with the union representing the university's lecturers.

In 2008, Roper attacked the government funding of Oxford University and Cambridge University, calling them "finishing schools" that had not delivered on government priorities for social mobility.
