= Ian Cooke =

Ian Cooke may refer to:

- Ian Cooke (field hockey) (born 1952), Australian field hockey player
- Ian Cooke (footballer), English former footballer
- Ian Cooke (musician), Chicago area folk musician

== See also ==
- Ian Cook (disambiguation)
