= Cordance =

Measure of brain activity

Cordance, a measure of brain activity, is a quantitative electroencephalographic (QEEG) method, developed in Los Angeles in the 1990s. It combines complementary information from absolute (the amount of power in a frequency band at a given electrode) and relative power (the percentage of power contained in a frequency band relative to the total spectrum) of EEG spectra.

Cordance is a measure of regional brain activity, computed using QEEG measures of brain wave patterns in an algorithm developed at the UCLA Laboratory of Brain, Behavior, and Pharmacology] by Andrew Leuchter and Ian Cook.

The cordance algorithm includes steps of (a) reattribution of EEG power, (b) spatial normalization of absolute and relative power, and (c) combination of the transformed absolute and transformed relative power to yield the cordance values themselves.

In comparison with other QEEG measures, such as absolute power or relative power, cordance appears to have a superior correlation with regional brain perfusion, one of the other standard measures of regional brain activity. Because cordance is derived from EEG signals, assessments of brain function with cordance do not require the use of radioactive tracer molecules, as is the case with some other functional neuroimaging methods (PET or SPECT scanning).

Cordance has been applied to studying brain activity in a variety of neurological and psychiatric disorders. A major area of study has been major depressive disorder, in efforts to develop biomarkers that could help guide treatment. This line of work was begun in the mid 1990s at UCLA and is now the subject of replication studies at other medical centers.
