= Peter Jackson (geographer) =

Peter Jackson, FBA, FAcSS (born 22 July 1955) is a British human geographer. Since 1993, he has been a professor of human geography at the University of Sheffield.

== Career ==
Jackson graduated from Keble College, Oxford, with a BA in Social Anthropology and a PhD in Geography. He then lectured at University College London from 1980 to 1993, the last year as a senior lecturer, before moving to the University of Sheffield to take up his professorship.

== Contributions ==
According to his departmental profile, Jackson's research focuses on "commodity culture and the geography of consumption with a particular interest in food". His Economic and Social Research Council (ESRC)-funded research on consumption and identity in North London was published as Shopping, Place and Identity in 1998, another ESRC project on men's magazines was published in 2001, and three years later a third ESRC-funded project led to the publication of Transnational Histories three years later. From 2005 to 2008, he was director of the "Changing Families, Changing Food" research programme funded by the Leverhulme Trust. From 2009 to 2013, he was also director of "Consumer Anxieties About Food" (CONANX), a European Research Council programme, leading to publications in 2013 and 2015.

== Honours ==
In 2001, Jackson was elected an Academician of the Academy of Social Sciences. In July 2017, he was elected a Fellow of the British Academy (FBA), the United Kingdom's national academy for the humanities and social sciences. In 2019, he was elected a member of the Academia Europaea.

== Selected works ==
- Maps of Meaning (London: Unwin Hyman, 1989).
- (Co-authored with Daniel Miller, Nigel Thrift, Beverly Holbrook, and Michael Rowlands) Shopping, Place and Identity (Routledge, 1998).
- (Co-authored with Nick Stevenson and Kate Brooks) Making Sense of Men's Magazines (Polity Press, 2001).
- (Co-edited with Philip Crang and Claire Dwyer) Transnational Spaces (Routledge, 2004).
- (Editor) Changing Families, Changing Food (London: Palgrave Macmillan, 2009).
- Food Words: Essays in Culinary Culture (London: Bloomsbury, 2013).
- Anxious Appetites: Food and Consumer Culture (London: Bloomsbury, 2015).
- (Co-authored with Helene Brembeck, Jonathan Everts, Maria Fuentes, Bente Halkier, Frej Daniel Hertz, Angela Meah, Valerie Viehoff and Christine Wenzl) Reframing Convenience Food (Palgrave, 2018).
