= Margot Sunderland =

British psychologist

Dr Margot Sunderland is a British adult and child psychotherapist. She is Director of Education and Training at the Centre for Child Mental Health Honorary Visiting Fellow at London Metropolitan University. She has been working with adult teenage and child clients for over 30 years. She is the author of over twenty books in the field of mental health, which collectively have been translated into 18 languages and published in 24 countries.

Her internationally acclaimed book, The Science of Parenting won First Prize in the British Medical Association Medical Book awards 2007 Popular Medicine section. The book, endorsed by the affective neuroscientist Professor Jaak Panksepp, is the result of ten years research on the long-term effects of adult-child interaction on the developing brain. The book has also been voted one of the top brain books of our time by the Dana Foundation. Her books which form the "Helping Children with Feelings" series are used as key therapeutic tools by child professionals.

Sunderland is also Chief Executive and Founding Director of the Institute for Arts and Therapy in Education, an Independent Higher Education College and academic partner of University of East London, training art psychotherapists, child psychotherapists, child counsellors. Sunderland has written or co-written Master's degree programmes, unique in the field of mental health and art therapy e.g. MA Integrative Arts Psychotherapy, MA Child Psychotherapy and MA Education: Emotional Literacy for Children.

== Publications and media ==
- Margot Sunderland ( 2022) Helping People Talk about Trauma cards and booklet (illustrations by Nicky Armstrong)
- Margot Sunderland ( 2021) Helping teenagers talk about their lIves cards and booklet ( Illustrations by Nicky Armstrong)
- Margot Sunderland (2019) Draw on Your Relationships. Second edition (illustrations by Nicky Armstrong), Routledge.
- Margot Sunderland (2018) Draw on Your Emotions. Second edition (illustrations by Nicky Armstrong), Routledge.
- Margot Sunderland (2018) The Emotion Cards, (illustrations by Nicky Armstrong), Routledge.
- Margot Sunderland (2018) The Relationship Cards, (illustrations by Nicky Armstrong), Routledge.
- Margot Sunderland (2015) "Conversations that Matter". Worth Publishing. ISBN 1903269245
- Margot Sunderland, Nicky Armstrong (Illustrator)(2013) "Helping Children with Troubled Parents: A Guidebook (Helping Children with Feelings)". Speechmark Publishing Ltd. ISBN 0863888003
- Margot Sunderland (2012). Bothered: Helping Teenagers to Talk about their Feelings. Speechmark Publishing Ltd. ISBN 0863889085
- Margot Sunderland (2012). Helping Teenagers with Anger & Low Self-Esteem. Hinton House Publishers Ltd. ISBN 1906531307
- Margot Sunderland (2008). Smasher: A Story to Help Adolescents with Anger & Alienation: A Story to Help Teenagers with Anger and Alienation. Hinton House Publishers Ltd. ISBN 1906531102
- Margot Sunderland (2008). The Science of Parenting. DK ADULT. ISBN 0-7566-3993-X
- Margot Sunderland (2007). What Every Parent Needs to Know: The incredible effects of love, nurture and play on your child's development. DK ADULT. ISBN 1405320362
- Margot Sunderland (2003). Helping Children Locked in Rage or Hate: A Guidebook. Speechmark Publishing Ltd. ISBN 0863884652
- Margot Sunderland (2003). Helping Children with Fear: A Guidebook. Speechmark Publishing Ltd. ISBN 0863884644
- Margot Sunderland (2001). Using Story Telling as a Therapeutic Tool with Children. Speechmark Publishing Ltd. ISBN 0863884253
