= Ian Arthur Naunton Cook =

Colonel Ian Arthur Naunton Cook OBE (1934–1994) was Commander of the British Police Mobile Unit in the New Hebrides between 1978 and 1979 and Commander of the Vanuatu Mobile Forces from Vanuatu’s independence in 1980 until 1984. Cook was involved in quelling the Santo Rebellion, and under his command the Vanuatu Mobile Force became ‘a disciplined and efficient paramilitary unit, displaying fine bearing on military occasions’. He was later an Overseas Security Adviser on diplomatic missions at the Foreign and Commonwealth Office.

== Life ==
Ian Arthur Naunton Cook was born in Bedfordshire on 21 September 1934, and educated at Bedford Modern School.

Cook began his career with the Royal Military Police before joining Her Majesty's Overseas Civil Service (HMOCS). He was initially posted to Malawi and later Belize before his appointment as Commander of the British Police Mobile Unit in the New Hebrides in 1978. At the time of Vanuatu’s independence in 1980, Cook was made Commander of the Vanuatu Mobile Forces. Under Cook’s command, the Vanuatu Mobile Force became ‘a disciplined and efficient paramilitary unit, displaying fine bearing on military occasions’. Alongside Andrew Stuart, the last British Resident Commissioner of the New Hebrides, Cook helped quell the Santo Rebellion. Stuart described Cook as ‘imperturbable’.

Cook was invested as an Officer in the Order of the British Empire in 1984. After retirement, Cook became an Overseas Security Adviser on diplomatic missions at the Foreign and Commonwealth Office. He died in Bedford in 1994.
