= Andrew Pickles =

English biostatistician

- Education: University of Cambridge; University of Wales
- Scientific career
- Fields: Biostatistics
- Workplaces: King's College London; University of Manchester
- Thesis: Applications of Stochastic Process Methods to Intra-Urban Residential Mobility (1982)

Andrew Richard Pickles FMedSci is an English biostatistician and Professor of Biostatistics and Psychological Methods in the Institute of Psychiatry, Psychology and Neuroscience at King's College London.

== Career ==
Beginning with an eclectic training in natural sciences and urban planning, Andrew became interested in statistical modelling of human behaviour, particularly in relation to major aspects of the life-course.

After teaching in Wales and the US and a postdoc in Cambridge, he was appointed as a statistician to the MRC Child Psychiatry Unit at the Maudsley hospital. Familiarisation with a range of statistical models led to a collaboration with Sophia Rabe-Hesketh in the development of a program and influential conceptual framework that integrated multilevel, structural equation and generalized linear models.

He was elected a Fellow of the Academy of Medical Sciences in 2009.

With an intervening appointment in medical and social statistics at the University of Manchester he returned to King's College London in 2010. His varied applied work has largely focussed on atypical behavioural and neurodevelopmental child development particularly of children on the autism spectrum.

He became a Senior Investigator at the National Institute for Health Research (NIHR) in 2018 and was elected to the British Academy in 2020.
