= Paul Cloke =

British geographer and author (1953–2022)

Paul John Cloke, FBA, FAcSS (17 February 1953 – 25 May 2022) was a British geographer, author and academic who was an emeritus professor of geography. He was known as the founding editor of the international and multidisciplinary academic Journal of Rural Studies, published by Elsevier Science. As of 2012, he was a faculty member of the Department of Geography at the University of Exeter.

== Early life and education ==
Paul John Cloke was born in Enfield, London on 17 February 1953. He attended the University of Southampton, graduating with a Bachelor's degree in geography. He studied for his PhD at Wye College (University of London). His academic area of expertise focused on human geography.

== Professional background ==
Following his graduation from Wye College, Cloke joined the staff of St David's University College, Lampeter (University of Wales). While at Lampeter, he was part of the Lampeter Geography School. He has also served as a professor of geography at the University of Bristol. At the time of his death he was an emeritus professor at the University of Exeter and adjunct professor at the University of Canterbury, New Zealand.

== Theology ==
Cloke was an Evangelical Christian and co-authored a trilogy of works entitled Mission in Marginal Places with theologian Mike Pears.

== Death ==
Cloke died from heart disease at Torbay Hospital in Torquay, Devon, on 25 May 2022, aged 69.

== Honours and awards ==
- 2022: Victoria Medal, Royal Geographical Society
- Doctor of Science, University of Bristol,
- 2002: Academician of the Academy of Learned Societies for the Social Sciences
- 2005: Honorary Fellow of the Royal Society of New Zealand
- 2009: Fellow of the British Academy

== Published works ==
Cloke was author or editor of over 40 books.

- Cloke, Paul J. 1983. An Introduction to Rural Settlement Planning, Taylor & Francis, Inc.. ISBN 978-0416738001
- Cloke, Paul J. 1985. Rural Resource Management, St. Martin's Press. ISBN 978-0312696023
- Cloke, Paul J. 1990. The Rural State?: Limits to Planning in Rural Society, Oxford University Press. ISBN 978-0198232872
- Cloke, Paul J. 1990. Policies and Plans for Rural People: An International Perspective, Taylor & Francis. ISBN 978-0047110177
- Cloke, Paul J. 1991. Approaching Human Geography, Guilford Publications, Inc. ISBN 978-0898624908
- Cloke, Paul J. 1992. Policy and Change in Thatcher's Britain: Policy and Planning and Critical Theory, Elsevier Science & Technology Books. ISBN 978-0080406473
- Cloke, Paul J. 1992. Rural Land-Use Planning in Developed Nations, Cengage Learning. ISBN 978-0047110252
- Cloke, Paul J. 1994. Writing The Rural, SAGE Publications. ISBN 978-1853961977
- Paul J. Cloke, Paul Milbourne, Thomas, Chris. 1994. Lifestyles in Rural England. Rural Development Commission. ISBN 9781869964405
- Cloke, Paul J., Goodwin, Mark and Milbourne, Paul. 1997. Rural Wales: Community and marginalisation. University of Wales Press. ISBN 9780708313657
- Cloke, Paul J. 1999. Introducing Human Geographies, London: Hodder Education (subsidiary of Hachette Publishing. ISBN 978-0340691939
- Cloke, Paul J. 2002. Rural Homelessness: Issues, Experiences and Policy Responses, Policy Press. ISBN 978-1861342843
- Jones, Owain and Cloke, Paul J. 2002. Tree Cultures: The Place of Trees and Trees in Their Place. Berg.
- Cloke, Paul J. 2004. Practising Human Geography, SAGE Publications. ISBN 978-1848604889
- Cloke, Paul J. 2005. Spaces of Geographical Thought: Deconstructing Human Geography's Binaries, SAGE Publications. ISBN 978-0761947318
- Cloke, Paul J. 2006. The Handbook of Rural Studies, SAGE Publications. ISBN 978-0761973324
- Cloke, Paul J. 2010. Swept-Up Lives?: Re-envisioning the Homeless City, Wiley-Blackwell. ISBN 978-1405153874
- Cloke, Paul J. 2010. Globalizing Responsibility: The Political Rationalities of Ethical Consumption, Wiley-Blackwell. ISBN 978-1405145589
- Del Casino, Vinnie, Thomas, Mary E., Cloke, Paul J. and Panelli, Ruth (eds.). 2011. A Companion to Social Geography. Wiley. ISBN 9781444395204
- Pears, Mike and Cloke, Paul J. (eds.). 2016. Mission in Marginal Places: The Theory. Paternoster.
- Pears, Mike and Cloke, Paul J. (eds.). 2016. Mission in Marginal Places: The Praxis. Paternoster.
- Cloke, Paul J. and Pears, Mike (eds.). 2019. Mission in Marginal Places: The Stories. Paternoster. ISBN 9781780781853
- Cloke, Paul J., Baker, Christopher, Sutherland, Callum and Williams, Andrew. 2019. Geographies of Postsecularity: Re-envisioning Politics, Subjectivity and Ethics. Routledge. ISBN 9781317367635
- Cloke, Paul J., David Conradson, Eric Pawson, and Harvey C. Perkins. 2023.The Post-earthquake City: Disaster and Recovery in Christchurch, New Zealand. Routledge. ISBN 9781000839401
