= Ian M. Cook =

British businessman

- Education: London Guildhall University
- Occupations: President, chairman & CEO at Colgate-Palmolive (2009–2018)
- Years active: 11
- Predecessor: Reuben Mark
- Successor: Noel Wallace
- Board member of: PepsiCo, Colgate-Palmolive

Ian M. Cook is a British businessman. He served as the chairman, president and chief executive officer of Colgate-Palmolive.

== Early life ==
Cook was born in Great Britain. He graduated from London Guildhall University, now known as London Metropolitan University, in 1975.

== Career ==
Cook joined Colgate-Palmolive in the United Kingdom in 1976. From 2002 to 2005, he served as executive vice president. In 2004, he was appointed chief operating officer, with responsibility for operations in North America, Europe, Central Europe, Asia and Africa. In 2005, he became president and continued to serve as COO. He was elected president, chief executive officer and joined the board of directors in 2007. In 2009, he became chairman of the board of directors, and continued on as president and CEO. In 2011, he earned over US$14 million.

Cook has served on the board of directors of PepsiCo since March 14, 2008. He is also a director of Catalyst, and the Consumer Goods Forum. He received the Legend in Leadership Award from the Yale School of Management in 2015.
