= Ian Cook (psychiatrist) =

American psychiatrist (b. 1960)

- Born: May 1, 1960 (age 65)
- Occupation: Psychiatrist

Ian Ainsworth Cook (born May 1, 1960) is an American psychiatrist. He is an associate professor of Psychiatry and Biobehavioral Sciences at the University of California, Los Angeles's David Geffen School of Medicine. He is also a research scientist at the UCLA Neuropsychiatric Institute and the Brain Research Institute at UCLA. He serves as director of the UCLA Depression Research Program and associate director of the UCLA Laboratory of Brain, Behavior, and Pharmacology. Cook holds the Joanne and George Miller & Family Chair in Depression Research.

== Education and training ==
Cook received magna cum laude Bachelor's of Science degree from Princeton University in electrical engineering and computer science in 1982. In 1987 he graduated from Yale University School of Medicine with an M.D. degree in Computer-Aided Medical Diagnosis. He began his residency training in psychiatry at the Anschutz Medical Campus of Denver Health Medical Center in 1988. A year later, he became a postdoctoral fellow at the Bioelectric Research Center, Columbia College of Physicians & Surgeons and two years later became a research fellow at the Quantitative EEG Laboratory of Neuropsychiatric Institute, a division of UCLA. He completed his training in 1994 at the Department of Psychiatry and Biobehavioral Sciences of UCLA Neuropsychiatric Institute before joining the faculty and becoming ABPN certified in psychiatry.

== Professional activities ==
Cook was president of the West Coast College of Biological Psychiatry from 2007 to 2009 and is a member of the Executive Committee on Practice Guidelines of the American Psychiatric Association. Dr. Cook co-founded HeartCloud, Inc., a digital health startup focused on remote physiologic monitoring, where he was CEO and chief medical officer. He is a named inventor on dozens of U.S. patents ranging from neuropsychiatric disorders to healthcare APIs.

Cook's work has largely focused on the care of mental disorders and disorders of complex human behavior. He is a co-inventor of the cordance method for studying regional brain activity with electroencephalograms.

Research by Cook and his colleagues has shown that past use of antidepressants can influence the brain's reaction to antidepressant placebos, that standard advice on diet and exercise for heart health can also lead to better brain health, that different types of advertisement evoke different types of brain activity, that electroencephalogram measurements could predict the outcome of antidepressant drug treatment on an individual patient long before the drugs make any observable changes to the patient's moods, and that electrical stimulation of the trigeminal nerve can be an effective alternative to drug therapy for depression.

== Fellowships ==
- 2009 - Distinguished Fellow of the American Psychiatric Association
