= Claire Dwyer =

British geographer and academic (1964–2019)

- Born: Claire Lucy Dwyer; 24 December 1964; Letchworth, Hertfordshire, England
- Died: 14 July 2019 (aged 54); Ealing, London, England
- Education: University of Oxford (BA); University of Nottingham (PGCE); Syracuse University (MA); University College London (PhD)
- Scientific career
- Fields: Human geography
- Workplaces: University College London
- Thesis: Construction and contestations of Islam : questions of identity for young British Muslim women (1997)
- Website: ucl.ac.uk/social-historical-sciences/claire-dwyer

Claire Lucy Dwyer (24 December 1964 – 14 July 2019) was a British academic, geographer and Professor of human geography at University College London until her death in 2019.

== Early life and education ==
Dwyer was born in Letchworth on 24 December 1964 to Michael Dwyer and Brenda (nee Jacques). Her father was a research engineer and her mother was a teacher.

Dwyer became interested in social geography during her childhood in the garden city of Letchworth. She attended St Angela's Roman Catholic school in Stevenage. She was an undergraduate student at Lady Margaret Hall, Oxford, graduating with a first-class geography degree from the University of Oxford in 1987. During her undergraduate degree she spent a year working with Mother Teresa in Calcutta. Dwyer completed a Postgraduate Certificate in Education (PGCE) at the University of Nottingham, and taught at secondary schools in Warminster.

She returned to academia and studied for a master's degree in critical feminism at Syracuse University. Her Master of Arts degree was awarded in 1991 for a dissertation on state-funded Muslim schools in the United Kingdom. She then carried out her doctoral research at University College London; supervised by Peter Jackson and Jacquie Burgess, Dwyer's PhD was awarded in 1997 for her thesis on the construction and contestations of Islam.

== Career and research ==
Dwyer was a social geographer with research interests in "the intersections of migration and multiculturalism and geographies of religion and ethnicity". She was also interested in gender and feminism. Dwyer was appointed to a full lectureship in geography in 1997 and was promoted to a senior lectureship in 2007. She was made Reader in Human Geography in 2014 and promoted to Professor in Geography in 2018. She was one of the first women to become a Professor of Human Geography in the United Kingdom.

Dwyer was also co-director of the Migration Research Unit at UCL from 2010 and in that capacity was involved in the establishment of the global migration Master of Science programme.

=== Publications ===
Her publications include;

- Geographies of New Femininities
- Qualitative Methodologies for Geographies: Issues and Debates
- Transnational Spaces
- New Geographies of Race and Racism
- Geographies of Children and Young People Volume 4: Identities and Subjectivities

== Personal life ==
Dwyer married Paul Farmer, the CEO of Mind, in 1994. Together they had two children, Ben and Thomas. She worked to bring together suburban faith communities, and staged exhibitions as part of the Making Suburban Faith project. These occurred in Gunnersbury Park Museum and at Somerset House.

After being diagnosed with cancer in 2018, Dwyer died at a hospice in Ealing on 14 July 2019.
