= Ian Cook (artist) =

British artist

- Born: 28 April 1983; Birmingham, England
- Website: PopbangColour

Ian Cook is a contemporary British artist who makes art with radio-controlled cars, actual car tyres, and toy car wheels. He operates under the corporate name 'PopbangColour'.

Cook became a car enthusiast at an early age and combined his passions for cars, toys and art to create his artworks. In order to achieve a specific feeling of movement, he uses a fleet of remote-controlled cars as his brushes.

== Early life ==
Ian Cook was born in Birmingham, England in 1983. Cook studied at Langley Secondary School, Solihull from 1994 to 1999, then went to Sutton Coldfield College to study a BTEC National Diploma for Illustration. Finally, he attended Winchester School of Art for Fine Art where he received a first-class BA Honours degree for painting. He then studied at the Art Academy of Latvia in Riga, Latvia, and it was there that he started employing vehicles in his works. Whilst in Latvia he produced photography and collected merchandise in regards to Range Rover.

For a short period, he became a lecturer in fine art and visual studies at Sutton Coldfield College's design centre.

== Work ==
To create his art, Cook spoons acrylic paint and ink onto large 2.5 x 1.5-metre Fabriano Paper and drives the radio-controlled cars over the canvas in short bursts to create the 'brush strokes'. He also uses full-size car tyres for large blocks of colour and small toy car wheels for different prints and textures. He first began this artwork style when Cook's ex-ex-girlfriend bought him a radio-controlled Lightning McQueen from the film Cars, quote: "And she told me, 'Don't take it down to your studio, and don't get paint on it.' " This inspired Cook to take a large canvas, place it on the floor and apply some paint to a toy car. Cook also uses a large truck to create the larger solid lines.

Cook creates his artworks in his studio, at Fargo Village, Coventry, where he is one of the artists in residence. Cook has been seen creating in public places across the United Kingdom for shows or promotions, including Goodwood Festival of Speed, Autosport International, Salon Privé and Britcar

Cook's artwork has been featured on Blue Peter, Top Gear, The One Show with Chris Evans and Jessie J and painted with Lewis Hamilton on Sky Sports F1.

In October 2008, Cook made a portrait of Formula 1 racing driver Lewis Hamilton the size of "two London double-decker buses", which was unveiled by Tower Bridge, London.

In March 2011, Cook featured on the ITV breakfast show Daybreak, where he created a portrait of Adrian Chiles and Christine Bleakley as well as the Daybreak logo.

Cook broke a Guinness World Record in March 2015 for creating the world's largest glow-in-the-dark painting (207 sq. m)
