= Harry Henry =

British market researcher (1916–2008)

- Born: 11 March 1916; London, England
- Died: 22 November 2008 (aged 92)
- Known for: Pioneer of market research
- Spouse: Mary Anstey

Harry Henry (11 March 1916 – 22 November 2008) was one of Britain's market research pioneers whose contributions to its acceptance and understanding won him an international reputation. He was the last survivor of the 23 founders of the Market Research Society (MRS), which he helped establish in 1947, and which now has 8,000 members in 50 countries. He married Mary Anstey, daughter of Vera Anstey, in 1938. She died in 1989, a year after they had celebrated their golden wedding anniversary.

In publishing, he was marketing director of the Thomson Organisation for nine years, where he also became a deputy managing director. His influence was significant in pulling an old-fashioned conservative industry towards the appreciation and practice of marketing in newspapers and magazines, a benefit inherited by radio and television. He was the first to use the computer in a market research study. In 1988, he received the Market Research Society's rarely awarded gold medal. In 2004, he received the Advertising Association's prestigious Mackintosh Medal, awarded for outstanding personal and public service to the industry (in this case, only the third time in the previous fifteen years, and also in recognition of forty years as chairman of its Advertising Statistics Committee).

== Early life and education ==
Harry Henry was born in London on 11 March 1916, as the elder son of an accountant, who died in 1924. His mother brought up and provided for her two sons by working as a dressmaker. He attended two primary schools, one in Finchley and the other in Hackney and at the age of eleven was transferred to Upton House London County Council Central School, in Homerton. He obtained the London Matriculation with Honours, and was awarded a Wedgewood Scholarship to City of London College in 1932. In 1934, he was awarded a Bursary that enabled him to enter the London School of Economics (LSE), where he read Economics, with Statistics as a subsidiary subject.

== Early career and continued education ==
In those days, the LSE had less than 3,000 students. Henry served as senior treasurer of the Students' Union, editor of the Clare Market Review, the union's official magazine (after having edited and largely written Felix, an extremely unofficial one), Chairman of the Social Committee, Chairman of the Literary Society, Business Manager of the Review of Economic Studies (an academic journal), and vice-chairman of the Labour Society.

Towards the end of this, he was involved in a libel action arising from an article he wrote in the University of London Union Magazine, pointing out that the gerrymandering involved in the election of the M.P. for London University gave control to the commercial correspondence colleges, whose interests were commercial rather than academic. Pressure from the judge (in chambers) led to a reluctant withdrawal, but there were no damages and he was convinced that Higher Authority had organised a cover-up.

He obtained a B.Sc. (economics) in 1937, which qualified him for his first job. Colman Prentis & Varley, a relatively new and extremely small advertising agency, having gained two minor advertising accounts from Procter & Gamble (just beginning to make a presence felt in the UK, under the name of Thomas Hedley) learnt that it would need a market research department. They went to LSE to find somebody to fill this role, in the mistaken belief that what was required was a statistician. Henry was appointed to this post in 1938, and began to learn about market research, largely by experiment. He supplemented this as the London correspondent of The Boston Globe, providing a weekly column on the various social and other activities of the family of Joseph Kennedy, the then US ambassador to London.

== World War II ==
The outbreak of WWII terminated these apprenticeships, and he was called up in 1940. After training in the ranks of the Royal Artillery, he was commissioned in 1941, and served as a regimental officer in various anti-aircraft batteries until 1943, when he transferred to the newly formed statistical branch of the Army as a Staff Officer. He was eventually posted to the headquarters staff of Montgomery's 21st Army Group, where he played a modest part in the preparations for the invasion of Europe and in subsequent operations in France, Belgium and Germany.

During the latter part of this period, he found the opportunity to use his market research skills in surveys of radio listening among the troops in that theatre of war, and was also responsible for the introduction of a number of what would later be referred to as Information Systems. One of these involved the production of a weekly abstract of administrative statistics for circulation throughout the theatre, and another, the devising and operating of 'TOCCI' (Theatre Officers Central Card Index), a system making use of Hollerith punched-card equipment to facilitate and speed up the demobilisation of officers.

== Post-war career ==
Henry was demobilised with the rank of major in 1946. He returned to Colman Prentis & Varley, which had begun to move into the big league, first as market research manager and shortly thereafter as director and general manager of Market Information Services Ltd, a subsidiary company that he created from scratch. By the time he left Market Information Services in 1954, it had grown into one of the top ten research companies in the country. These years were a period of rapid expansion in the field of market research as a whole, and he took his part in the development of many of the procedures which subsequently came into common use.

=== Market Research Society ===
He was one of the 23 people who, in 1946, founded the Market Research Society, and played a major role both in the development of research techniques and in the promotion of market research as a tool of management. His particular interest in the media of communication was stimulated by the fact that he was responsible for the planning, conduct and production from 1947 to 1953 of the Hulton Readership Surveys, which were the predecessors of what became the National Readership Surveys. In this same area, he was responsible for the Hulton Tables of Advertisement Attention Value (1949), the development of the first system for using punched-card equipment to compute net press coverage (1949), and the first national surveys of readership among farmers (1947), among retailers (1948) and among children (1950). He was also Editor and joint author of The Rural Market (1948) and Patterns of British Life (1950).

=== McCann-Erickson Advertising ===
In 1954, he joined McCann-Erickson Advertising Ltd. as Director of Research, and there built up a very sizeable research department, more closely integrated with the overall workings of the agency than was usual in those days. In particular, it became agency policy to persuade clients (particularly new clients) that full-scale research into their markets would result in more effective advertising. In 1959, he launched Marplan Ltd., a subsidiary company, which developed along these lines into what was one of the leading market research agencies in Great Britain. He organised the establishment of sister Marplan companies in Belgium, France and Germany, and was Chairman of the McCann-Erickson European Research Committee, while continuing as a senior member of the board of McCann-Erickson Ltd.

=== Revolution in research ===
During the mid-1950s, he had come to the conclusion that the existing techniques of market research, though adequate to the measurement of consumer behaviour, could not offer a reliable framework for marketing decisions. This led to the publication of his 1958 book, Motivation Research: Its Practice and Uses, the first on the subject to be published in Europe. In this book, he drew on his experience to produce a practical guide to the rigorous scientific use of indirect techniques to produce insights which, he argued, could not be validly or even reliably derived from direct questioning or discussion.

=== The Thomson Organisation ===
In 1961, he was invited to join the Board of The Thomson Organisation Ltd, then principally (apart from its ownership of Scottish Television) the publisher of the Sunday Times and a raft of regional newspapers, as Director of Marketing, bringing marketing into newspaper publishing for the first time.

In 1962, he established the annual Thomson Medals and Awards for Advertising Research, which, by stimulating fresh thinking on media research problems, were responsible over the following ten years for the formulation and dissemination of a number of fundamental contributions to the theory and practice of advertising. Also in 1962, he took advantage of the relaxation by Nikita Khrushchev of the rigidity of Soviet rule to mount an unprecedented promotion exercise for the recently launched Sunday Times Colour Magazine, which did not immediately return satisfactory advertising revenue. This involved hiring a Tupolev Tu-114 from Aeroflot in which to fly a plane-load of British business tycoons for the week-end, to meet and talk to their opposite numbers in Moscow.

In 1965, after successfully tendering for the contract from Post Office Telecommunications for the introduction into the UK of 'yellow pages' telephone directories, he set up and was the first Chairman of Thomson Yellow Pages Ltd. In 1968, he and Mick Shields (of Associated Newspapers) were asked by Cecil King, then Chairman of the Newspaper Publishers' Association, to examine the practicability of the introduction into the Association of a marketing function as a means of improving the efficiency of the national newspaper industry and of enabling it better to withstand competition. This led to the establishment of a consortium, the 'NPA Marketing Executive' (which he chaired) and the recruitment of some specialist staff, but which petered out because, as he observed then and at intervals over the next thirty years, the national newspaper publishers would always prefer to hang separately than to hang together. But what might be regarded as its successor was launched in 2002 as the Newspaper Marketing Agency. He left the Thomson Organisation in 1970, setting up his own consultancy in 1971.

=== Admap ===
As Consultant Editor and subsequently as Editor-in-Chief of Admap, he consolidated that publication's reputation for intellectual stringency and authority, which sets it aside from the generality of newsy, even gossipy, advertising periodicals. In 1983, he joined Mike Waterson in setting up a modest venture to launch the quarterly Food & Drink Forecast. This developed rapidly, and had grown by 1998 into Information Sciences Ltd and become one of the world's largest private sector suppliers of economic information through its operating arm NTC Research Ltd, and one of the world's major publisher of advertising and media knowledge via Admap, many other trade journals and books, and the World Advertising Research Center.

== Impact on the field of marketing ==
His whole career was marked by innovation. He was the first to use a computer LEO computer (Lyons Electronic Office) was a series of early computer systems created by J. Lyons and Co. ], the first UK computer dedicated to business use) to analyse market research data (1959) and the first to do so in a readership survey (for the Western Mail in 1961). He carried out the first national study of public attitudes towards advertising (1954), the first survey of the poster audience (1948), the first readership survey among retailers (1948), the first national readership survey among children(1950), and the first qualitative study of regional newspaper readership (1963). In 1956, he acted as technical consultant to the first Italian national readership survey.

Not surprisingly, he has been much in demand by industry and academic bodies. He was at various times (and sometimes simultaneously) Visiting Professor of Marketing at the University of Bradford and the Cranfield Institute of Technology (now University), and Professor of Marketing and Media Policy at the International Management Centres. He was for twelve years Chairman of the Marketing Communication Research Centre, an ongoing operation funded by a number of major marketing companies which was founded in Bradford in 1972, and subsequently moved to Cranfield when he did. He had chaired the technical sub-committee of the National Readership Survey, and the Research Committees of the Regional Newspaper Advertising Bureau and of British Posters, and was for forty years Chairman of the Research Committee of the Advertising Association. He was a Governor of the History of Advertising Trust, and a member of the editorial boards of the Journal of Advertising History and the International Journal of Advertising.

== Publications ==
As a by-product of his business and academic activities, and in various managerial capacities, he wrote and lectured extensively, in a number of countries, on management, marketing, research and related topics. Books published in earlier years, include Patterns of British Life (1948) and The Rural Market (1950).

His first book, written when he was 21 years old, The Insurance Man and his Trade (1938), in the 'Fact' library published monthly by Raymond Postgate (1/- cloth board, 6d. paper covers), suggested that burial insurance was 'the grossest form of systematic exploitation ever practised in this country'.

A selection of his papers up to 1971 having been published in that year under the title of Perspectives in Management, Marketing and Research.

Later publications included Behind the Headlines: Readings in the Economics of the Press (1978) and The Dynamics of the British Press, 1961 to 1984 (1986) and he edited the massive Proceedings of the four International Readership Research Symposia of 1981, 1983, 1985 and 1988 (published as Readership Research: Theory and Practice).
