= Ian Cook (geographer) =

British geographer

Ian Cook is an Emeritus Professor of Cultural Geography at the University of Exeter in the United Kingdom, and formerly a Lecturer and Senior Lecturer in Human Geography at the University of Birmingham, and a Lecturer in Human Geography at the University of Wales, Lampeter.

== Background ==
Cook has a BSc in Human Sciences, University College London (1986); an MA in Human Geography, University of Kentucky (1992); a PhD in Human Geography, University of Bristol (1997). Their PhD was highly autobiographical, and took several years to be awarded. They began their academic career at the University of Wales, Lampeter (1993-9), then worked at the University of Birmingham (1999-2007), before moving to the University of Exeter (2007-2025).

They were the Director of Education & Resources for the Fashion Revolution movement (2014-2016) and a Visiting Professor of Geography, University of Paris 7 - Denis Diderot (2016-18).

== 'Follow the thing' ==
Cook's contributions to research, teaching and pedagogy have been to develop geographical approaches to:

- material culture studies via a 'follow the thing' approach connecting the lives of the producers and consumers of commodities, starting with papaya grown, and hot pepper sauces made, in Jamaica and consumed in the United Kingdom.
- ethnographic and autoethnographic research practices, in particular those suited to the multi-sited demands of 'follow the thing' studies and the creative, first person and filmic writing that can be appropriate to convey its research findings.
- trade justice pedagogies that encourage learners to research and publish online their own 'follow the thing' studies of things that matter to them and to consider appropriate responses to any labour rights issues surfaced in the process.
- non-traditional open-access academic publishing, most notably followthethings.com which is a spoof online store showcasing research into the making, discussing and impacts of over 100 examples of 'follow the thing' trade justice activism (2011-date).
- address elements of the 'unfollowable thing' critique of early research in this genre, in projects involving LEGO to visualise labour in supply chain research's inaccessible spaces and collaborative, digitally informed social artwork to surface the role played by algorithms, datafication and predictive analytics in the geographies of trade.

== Awards and recognition ==
- in 2013, Cook's 'follow the things' approach - and the followthethings.com website - was incorporated into the UK's National Curriculum for Geography's teaching of global trade, ethics and sustanability.
- in 2017, Cook received the Royal Geographical Society's 'Taylor & Francis Award for Excellence in the Promotion & Practice of Teaching and Learning of Geography in Higher Education'

== See also ==
- Lampeter Geography School
