= Financial centre =

Location with high concentration of commerce activity

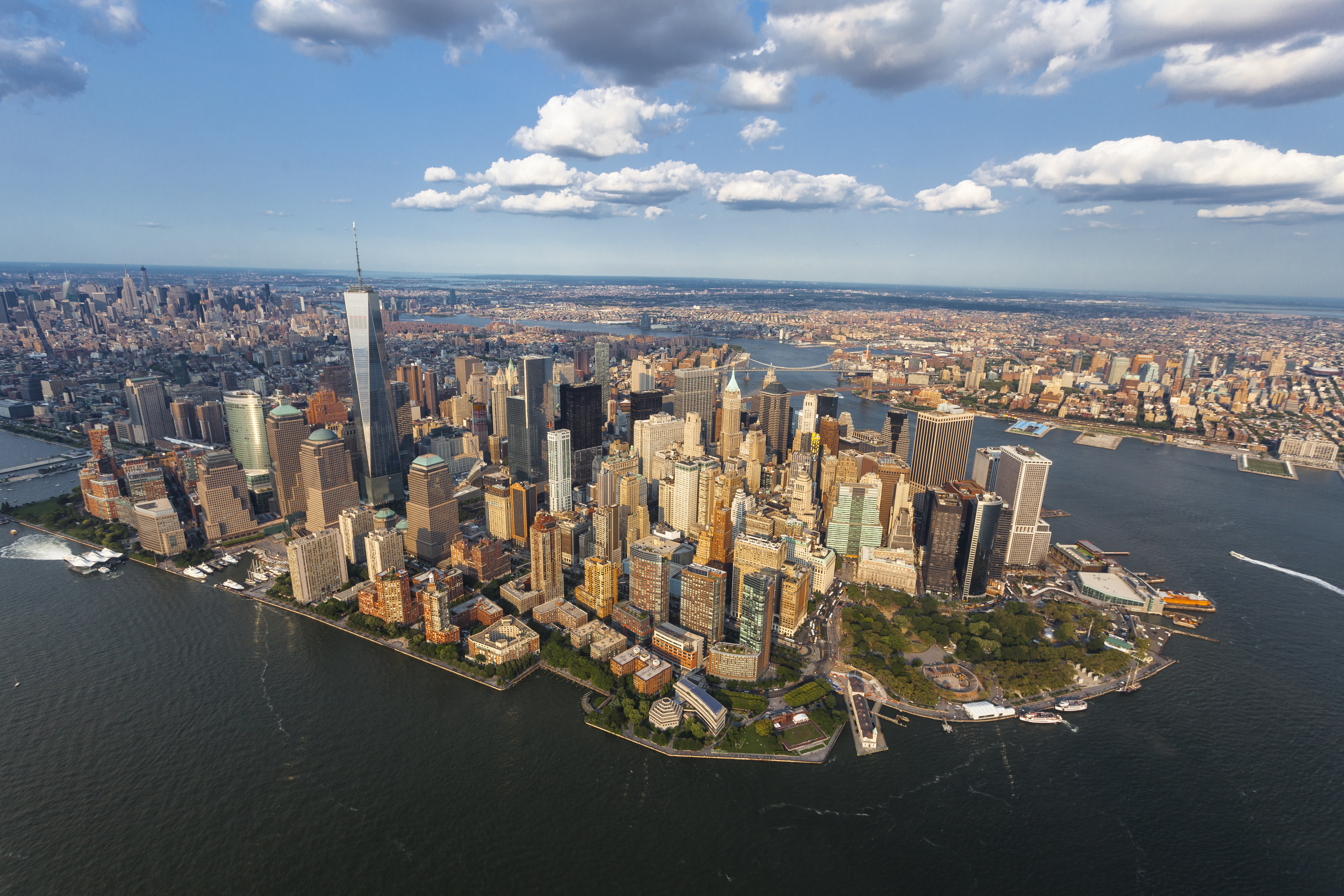
New York City's Financial District in Lower Manhattan, including Wall Street. New York City is the largest financial centre and fintech centre in the world.

A financial centre (financial center in American English) or financial hub is a location with a significant concentration of commerce in financial services.

The commercial activity that takes place in a financial centre may include banking, asset management, insurance, and provision of financial markets, with venues and supporting services for these activities. Participants can include financial intermediaries (such as banks and brokers), institutional investors (such as investment managers, pension funds, insurers, and hedge funds), and issuers (such as companies and governments). Trading activity often takes place on venues such as exchanges and involves clearing houses, although many transactions take place over-the-counter (OTC), directly between participants. Financial centres usually host companies that offer a wide range of financial services, for example relating to mergers and acquisitions, public offerings, or corporate actions; or which participate in other areas of finance, such as private equity, private debt, hedge funds, and reinsurance. Ancillary financial services include rating agencies, as well as provision of related professional services, particularly legal advice and accounting services.

As of the 2025 edition of the Global Financial Centres Index, New York City, London and Hong Kong ranked as the global top three.

== Definitions ==
The International Monetary Fund (IMF) classes major financial centres as:

- International Financial Centres (IFCs), such as New York City, London, and Tokyo;
- Regional Financial Centres (RFCs), such as Hong Kong, Shanghai, and Frankfurt; and
- Offshore Financial Centres (OFCs), such as the Cayman Islands, Dublin, Cyprus, and Luxembourg. (Note: "Offshore" does not refer to the location of the OFC (i.e. many FSF–IMF OFCs, such as Luxembourg and Hong Kong, are located "onshore"), but to the fact that the largest users of the OFC are nonresident (i.e. the users are non-domestic).)

The IMF notes some overlap between Regional Financial Centres and Offshore Financial Centres.

=== International Monetary Fund approach ===
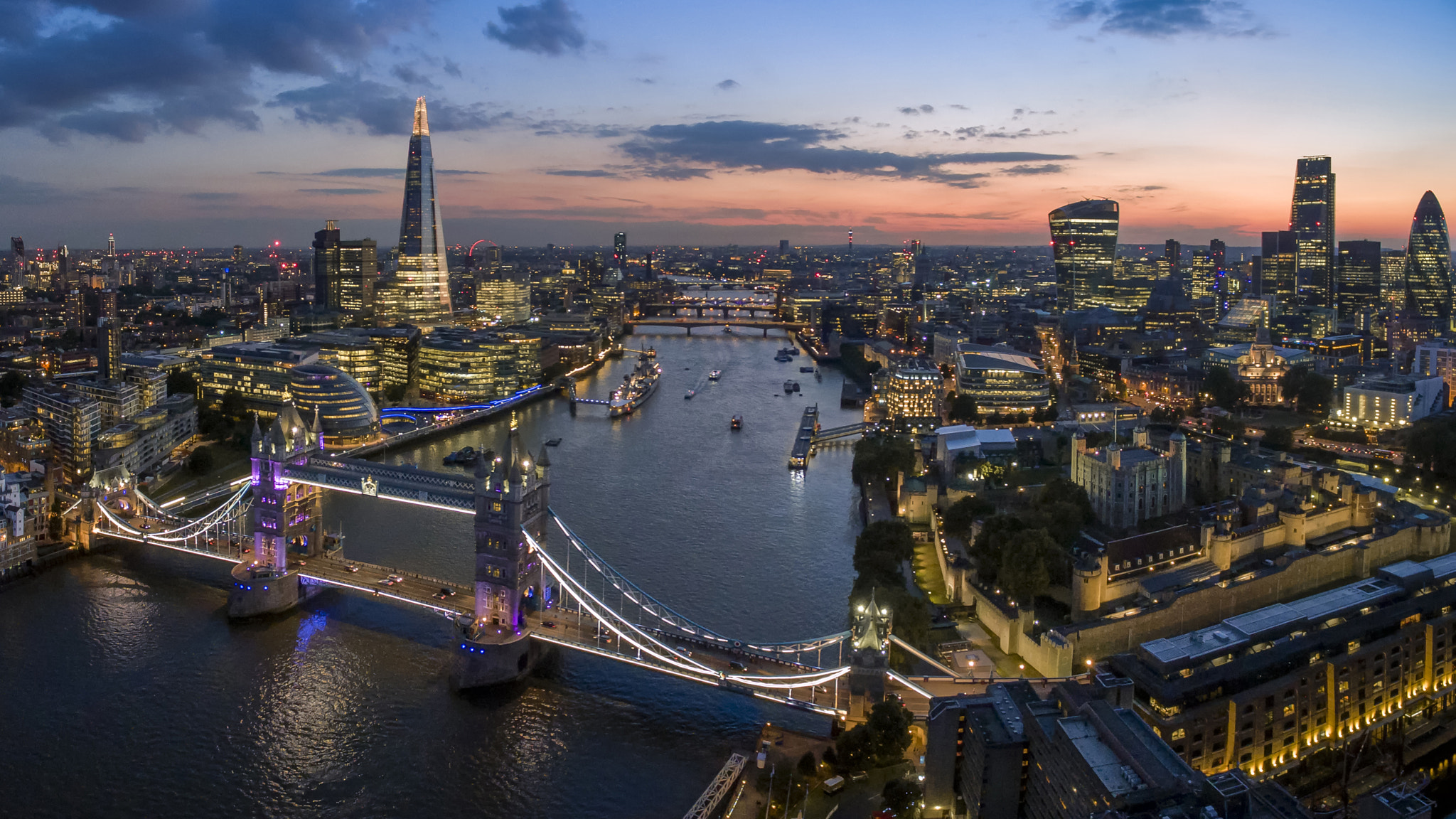
London, concentrated in the City of London and Canary Wharf, is one of the main global financial centres and a leading centre of technology-enabled financial innovation.

In April 2000, the Financial Stability Forum ("FSF"), (Note: The FSF is a group consisting of major national financial authorities such as finance ministries, central bankers, and international financial bodies) concerned about OFCs on global financial stability produced a report listing 42 OFCs. In June 2000, the International Monetary Fund (IMF) published a working paper on OFCs, but which also proposed a taxonomy on classifying the various types of global financial centres, which they listed as follows (with the description and examples they noted as typical of each category, also noted):

1. International Financial Centre (IFC). Described by the IMF as being large international full–service centres with advanced settlement and payments systems, supporting large domestic economies, with deep market liquidity where both the sources and uses of funds are diverse, and where the legal and regulatory frameworks are adequate to safeguard the integrity of principal–agent relationships and supervisory functions. IFCs generally borrow short–term from non–residents and lend long–term to non–residents. Examples cited by the IMF included New York City, London, and Tokyo.
2. Regional Financial Centre (RFC). The IMF noted that RFCs, like IFCs, have developed financial markets and infrastructure and intermediate funds in and out of their region, but in contrast to IFCs, have relatively small domestic economies. Examples cited by the IMF included Hong Kong, Singapore, and Luxembourg.
3. Offshore Financial Centre (OFC). The IMF noted that OFCs are usually smaller, and provide more specialist services; however, OFCs still ranged from centres that provide specialist and skilled activities, attractive to major financial institutions, and more lightly regulated centres that provide services that are almost entirely tax driven and have very limited resources to support financial intermediation. The IMF listed 46 OFCs in 2000, the largest of which was Ireland, the Caribbean (including the Cayman Islands, and the British Virgin Islands), Hong Kong, Singapore, and Luxembourg.

The IMF noted that the three categories were not mutually exclusive and that various locations could fall under the definition of an OFC and an RFC, in particular (e.g. Singapore and Hong Kong were cited).

International Financial Centres, and many Regional Financial Centres, are full–service financial centres with direct access to large capital pools from banks, insurance companies, investment funds, and listed capital markets, and are major global cities. Offshore Financial Centres, and also some Regional Financial Centres, tend to specialise in tax-driven services, such as corporate tax planning tools, tax–neutral vehicles, (Note: Tax–neutral is a term that OFCs use to describe legal structures where the OFC does not levy any taxes, duties or VAT on fund flows into, during, or exiting (e.g. no withholding taxes) the vehicle. Major examples being the Irish Qualifying investor alternative investment fund (QIAIF), and the Cayman Islands SPC.) and shadow banking/securitisation, and can include smaller locations (e.g. Luxembourg), or city-states (e.g. Singapore). Since 2010, academics consider Offshore Financial Centres synonymous with tax havens. (Note: This is since circa 2010, after the post 2000 IMF–OECD–FATF initiatives on common standards, regulatory compliance, and banking transparency, which had significantly weakened the regulatory attraction of OFCs over IFCs and RFCs.)

=== Offshore financial centres ===
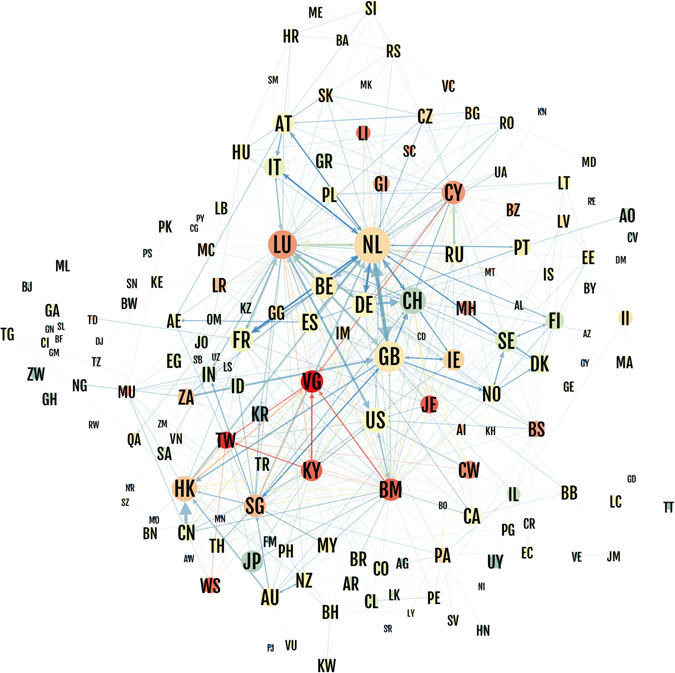
Mapping the links between financial centres including conduit and sink offshore financial centres

The IMF noted that OFCs could be set up for "legitimate purposes" (listing various reasons), but also for what the IMF called "dubious purposes", citing tax evasion and money-laundering. In 2007, the IMF produced the following definition of an OFC: "a country or jurisdiction that provides financial services to non-residents on a scale that is incommensurate with the size and the financing of its domestic economy". The FSF annual reports on global shadow banking use the IMF definition to track the OFCs with the largest financial centres relative to their domestic economies.

Progress from 2000 onwards from IMF–OECD–FATF initiatives on common standards, regulatory compliance, and banking transparency, has reduced the regulatory attraction of OFCs over IFCs and RFCs. Since 2010, academics considered the services of OFCs to be synonymous with tax havens, and use the term OFC and tax haven interchangeably (e.g. the academic lists of tax havens include all the FSF–IMF OFCs).

In July 2017, a study by the University of Amsterdam's CORPNET group, broke down the definition of an OFC into two subgroups, Conduit and Sink OFCs:

- 24 Sink OFCs: jurisdictions in which a disproportionate amount of value disappears from the economic system (e.g. the traditional tax havens).
- 5 Conduit OFCs: jurisdictions through which a disproportionate amount of value moves toward Sink OFCs (e.g. the corporate-focused tax havens)
  (Conduits are: Netherlands, United Kingdom, Switzerland, Singapore and Ireland)

Sink OFCs rely on Conduit OFCs to re-route funds from high-tax locations using base erosion and profit shifting ("BEPS") tax planning tools, which are encoded, and accepted, in the Conduit OFC's extensive networks of global bilateral tax treaties. Because Sink OFCs are more closely associated with traditional tax havens, they tend to have more limited treaty networks and access to global higher-tax locations.

== Rankings ==
Prior to the 1960s, there was little data available to rank financial centres. In recent years many rankings have been developed and published. Two of the most relevant are the Global Financial Centres Index and the Xinhua–Dow Jones International Financial Centres Development Index.

=== Global Financial Centres Index ===
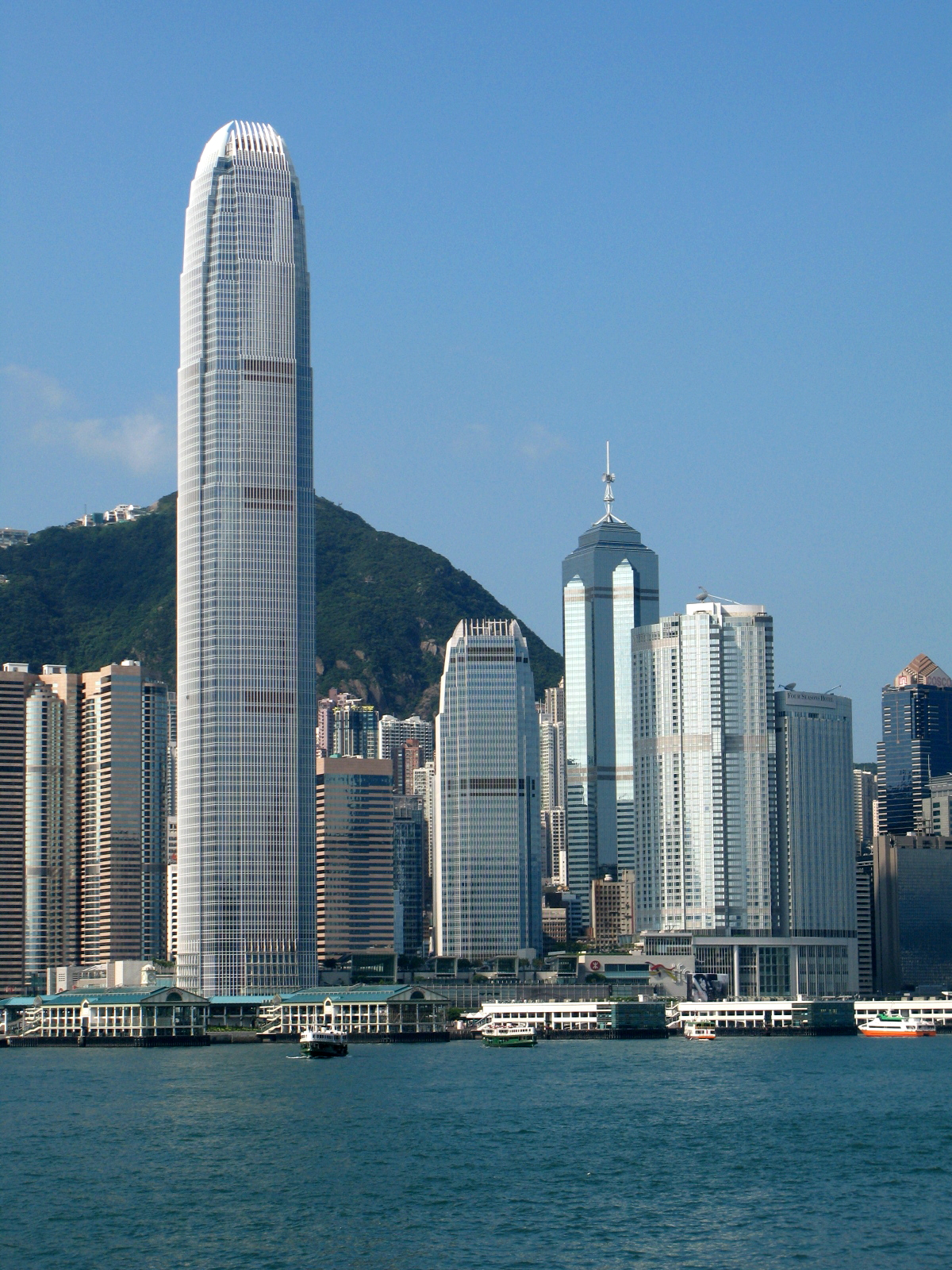
The International Finance Centre building in Hong Kong

The Global Financial Centres Index ("GFCI") is compiled semi-annually by the London-based think tank Z/Yen in conjunction with the Shenzhen-based think tank China Development Institute. The 40th edition of the GFCI was published on the 16th September 2026.

GFCI 40 (September 2026)
Rank	Centre	Rating	Change in rank	Change in rating
1	(United States) New York City	761	Steady	▼6
2	(United Kingdom) London	757	Steady	▼9
3	Hong Kong	756	Steady	▼9
4	Singapore	755	Steady	▼9
5	(China) Shanghai	754	▲1	▲11
6	(Japan) Tokyo	753	▲4	▲14
7	(South Korea) Seoul	752	▲1	▲11
8	(China) Shenzhen	751	▲1	▲11
9	(United Arab Emirates) Dubai	750	▼2	▲8
10	(Switzerland) Zurich	749	▲1	▲11
11	(United States) San Francisco	748	▼6	▲4
12	(Switzerland) Geneva	747	▲6	▲16
13	(United Arab Emirates) Abu Dhabi	746	▲8	▲18
14	(United States) Los Angeles	745	▼2	▲8
15	(United States) Chicago	744	▼1	▲9
16	(China) Beijing	743	▲6	▲16
17	Luxembourg	742	▼1	▲9
18	(United States) Boston	741	▼5	▲5
19	(United States) Washington, D.C.	740	▼2	▲8
20	(Japan) Osaka	739	▲6	▲16

== Examples ==
London, Paris, Amsterdam and New York have long been at the centre of the global financial system. Today there is a diverse range of financial centres worldwide. While New York and London (both referred to as Alpha cities) often stand out as the leading global financial centres, other established financial centres provide significant competition and several newer financial centres are developing. Despite this proliferation of financial centres, academics have discussed evidence showing increasing concentration of financial activity in the largest national and international financial centres in the 21st century. Others have discussed the ongoing dominance of New York and London, and the role linkages between these two financial centres played in the 2008 financial crisis.

Comparisons of financial centres focus on their history, role and significance in serving national, regional and international financial activity. Each centre's offering includes differing legal, tax and regulatory environments. One journalist suggested three factors for success as a financial city: "a pool of capital to lend or invest; a decent legal and taxation framework; and high-quality human resources".

=== Major IMF IFCs ===
New York, London, and Tokyo are in every list of major IFCs. London and New York have at times exchanged places as the world's preeminent financial centre, and London has been competing for New York's crown as a financial capital and Fintech capital of the world. Some of the major RFCs (see next section), such as Paris, Frankfurt, Chicago, and Shanghai, appear as IFCs in some lists.

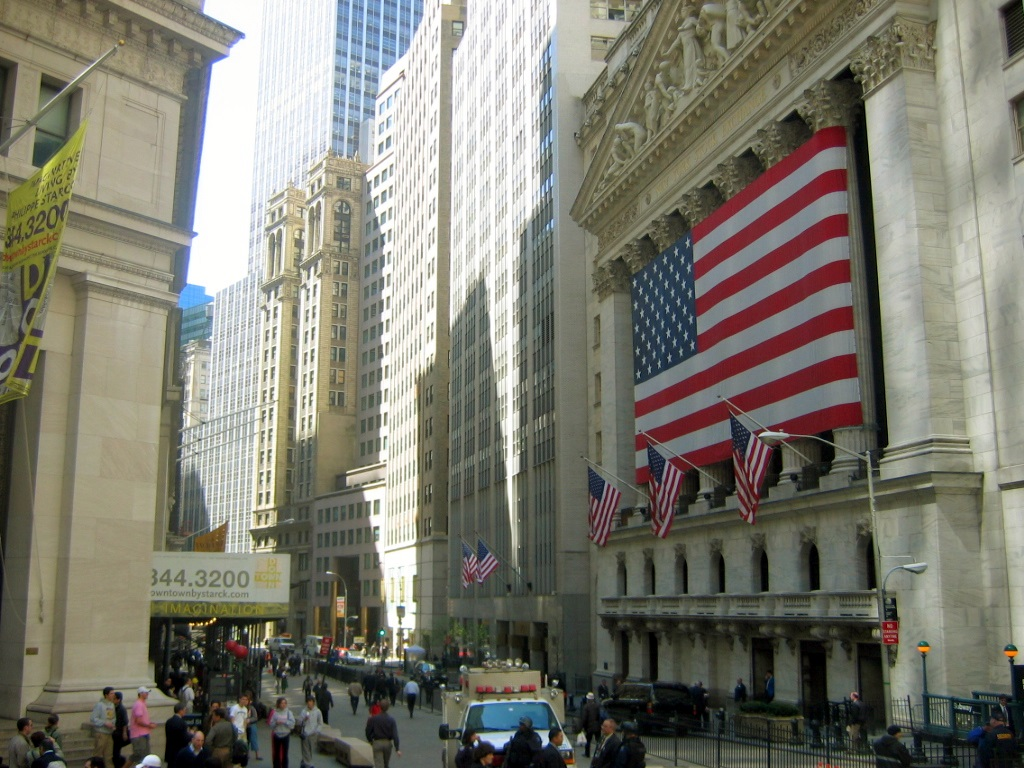
The New York Stock Exchange on Wall Street, the world's largest stock exchange by listed capitalisation

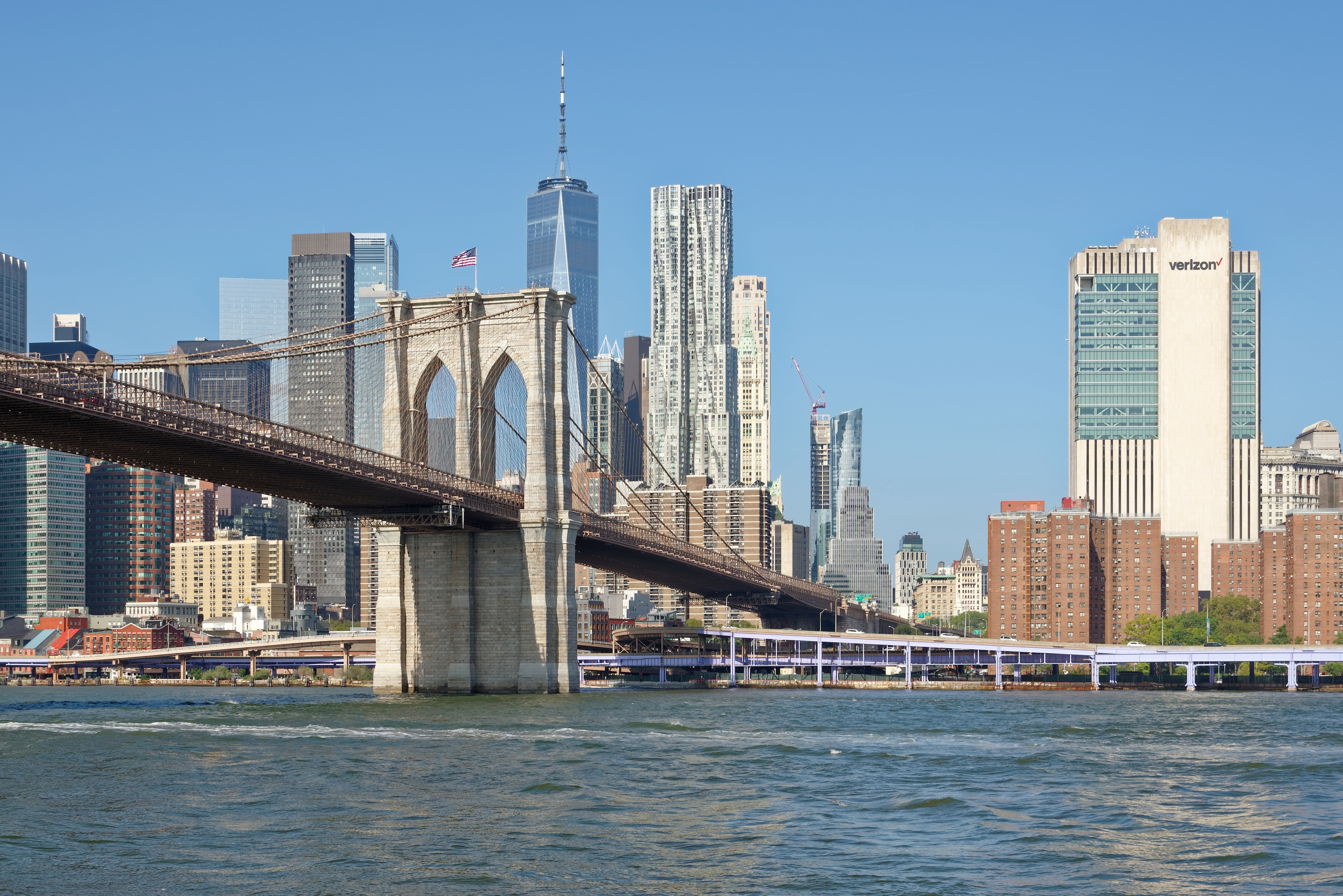
New York City's financial district in Manhattan viewed from Brooklyn

- New York City. New York City is the largest centre for trading in public equity and debt capital markets, driven by the size and financial development of the U.S. economy and international activity that takes place there. The NYSE and NASDAQ are the two largest stock exchanges in the world. New York also leads in hedge fund management; private equity; and the monetary volume of mergers and acquisitions. Several investment banks and investment managers headquartered in New York City are important participants in other financial centres. The New York Federal Reserve Bank, the largest within the Federal Reserve System, regulates financial institutions and implements U.S. monetary policy, which in turn influences the world's economy. The three major global credit rating agencies – Standard and Poor's, Moody's Ratings, and Fitch Ratings – are headquartered or co–headquartered in New York City, with Fitch being co–headquartered in London.

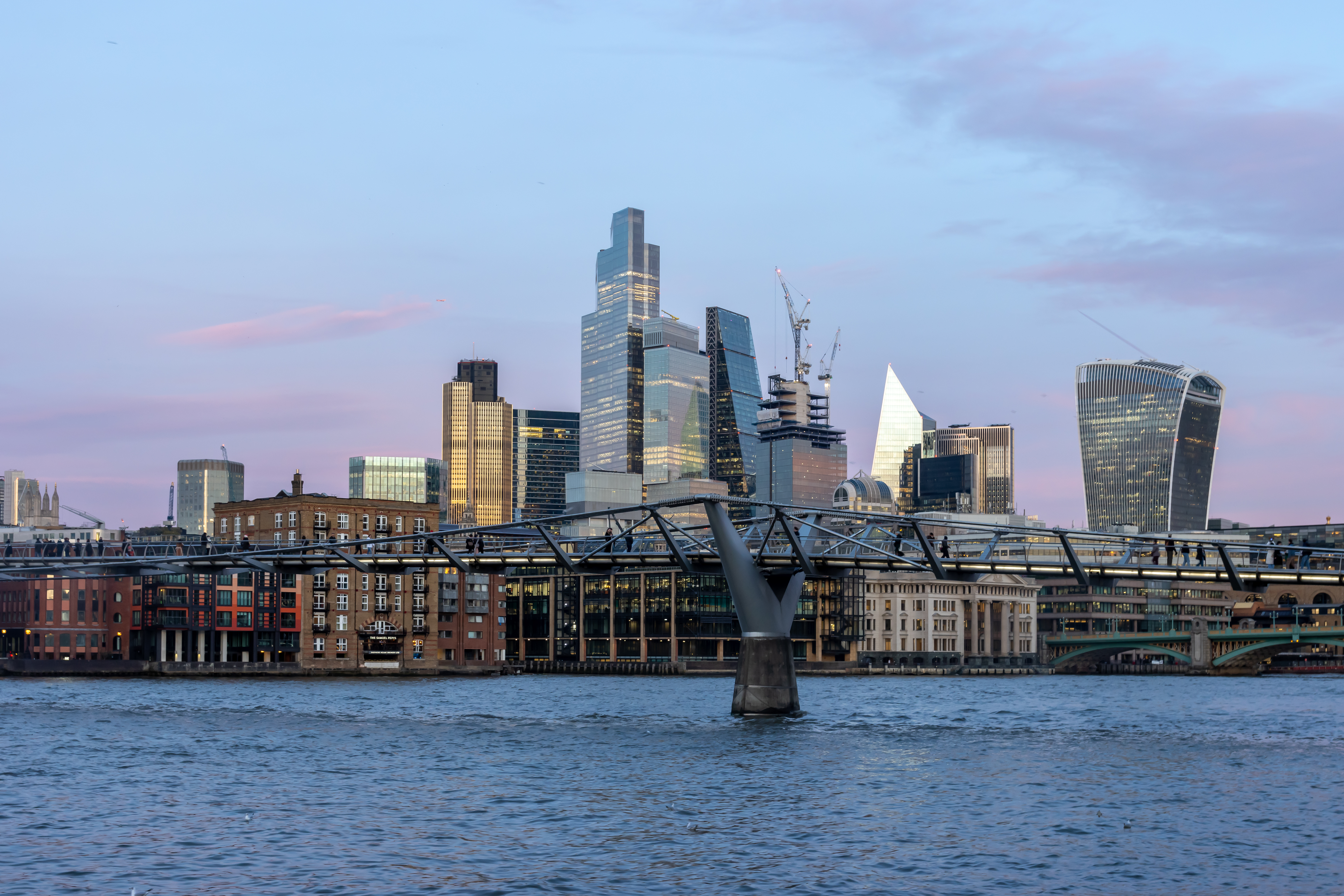
London's primary financial district, The Square Mile

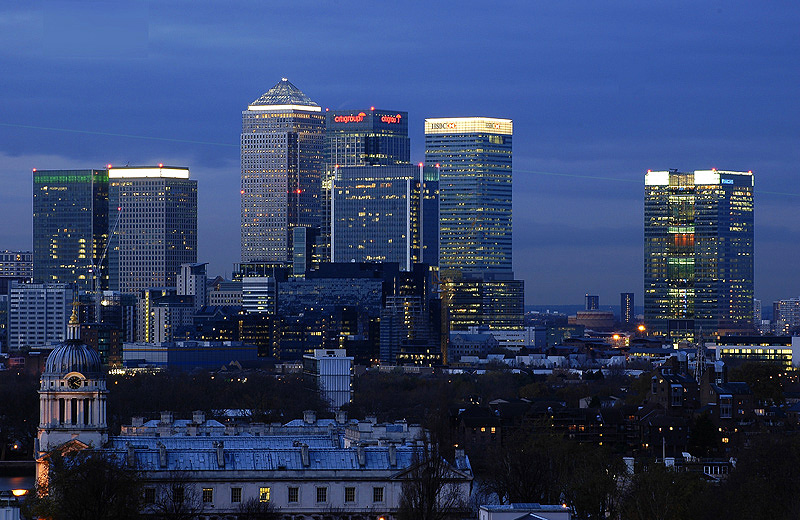
London's second financial district, Canary Wharf

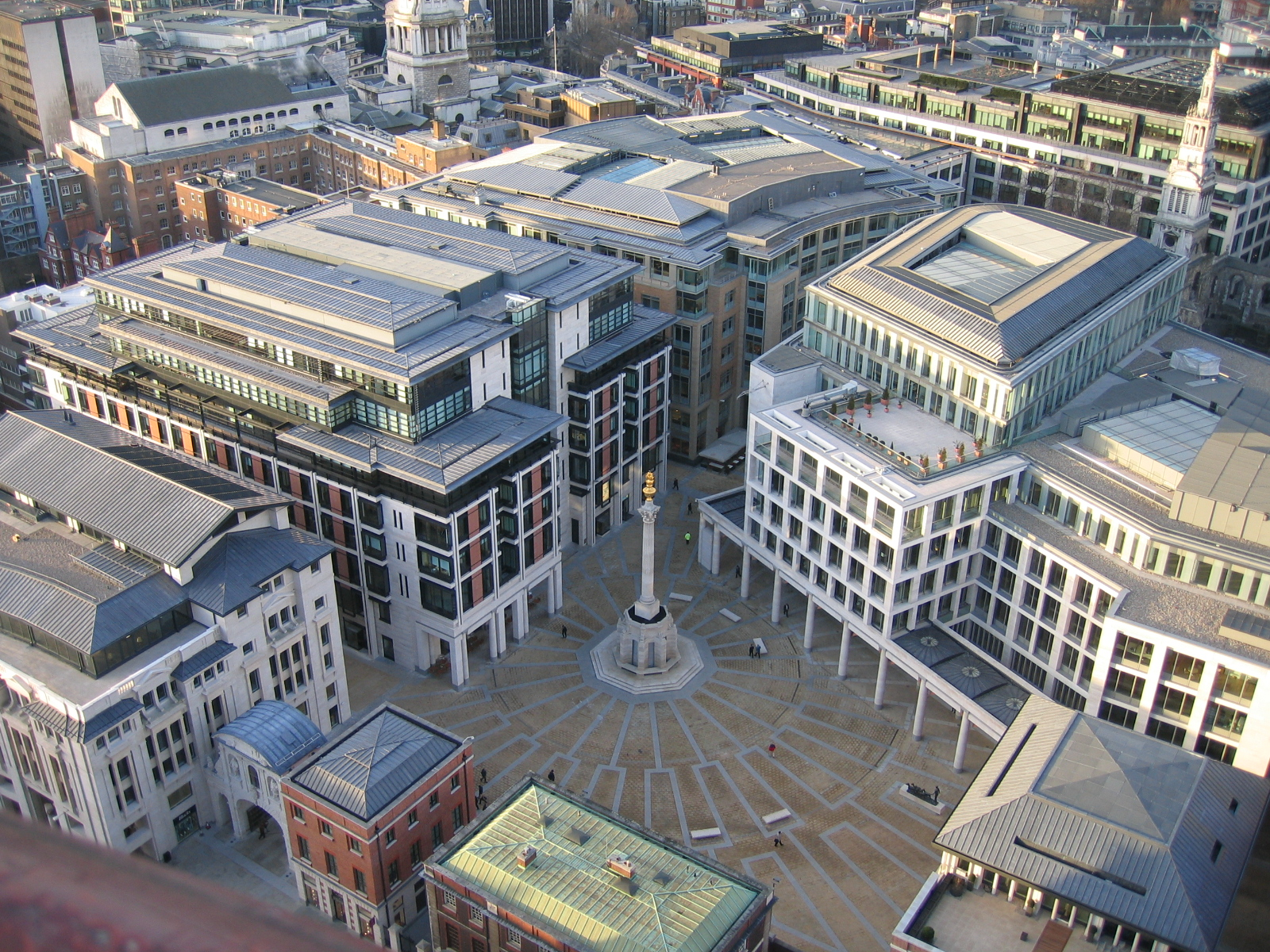
The London Stock Exchange in the City of London, the largest exchange in Europe by capitalisation

- London. London maintains a leading position as a financial centre and maintains the largest trade surplus in financial services around the world. However, like New York, it faces new competitors including fast-rising eastern financial centres such as Hong Kong and Shanghai. London is the largest centre for derivatives markets, foreign exchange markets, money markets, issuance of international debt securities, international insurance, trading in gold, silver and base metals through the London bullion market and London Metal Exchange, international bank lending and Europe's share trading capital. London has the second largest concentration of hedge funds (847 according to one source). London benefits from its position between the Asia and U.S. time zones, and benefited from its location within the European Union, although this ended in 2020 when the United Kingdom left the European Union following the Brexit referendum of 2016. As well as the London Stock Exchange, the London Clearing House is based in the city. Although post-Brexit London has faced challenges, London has defied predictions of having its European financial capital crown stripped to cities like Paris, Amsterdam, Frankfurt and even Dublin.

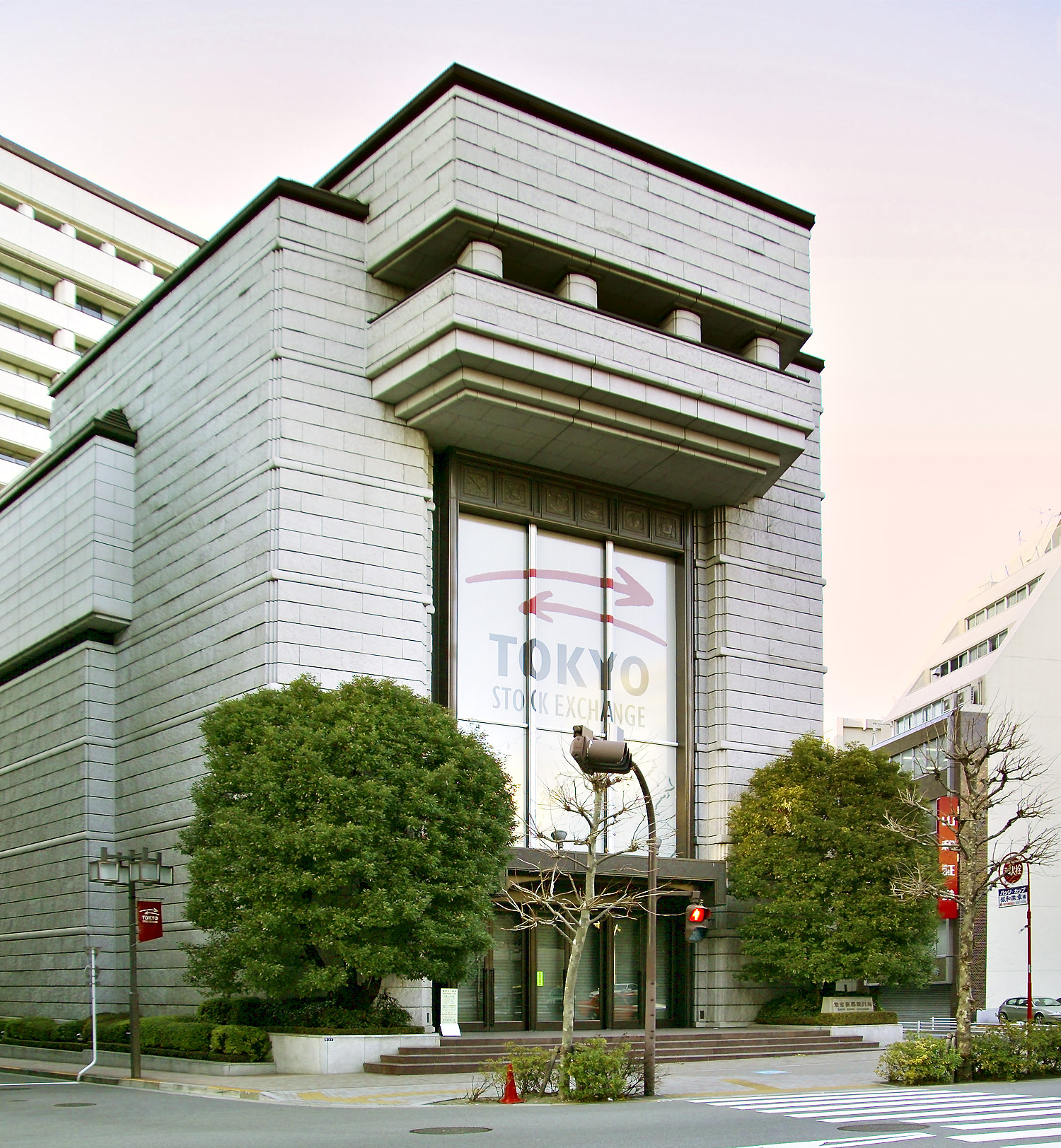
The Tokyo Stock Exchange, located in Nihonbashi-Kabutocho, Tokyo, Japan, is the largest stock exchange in Asia.

- Tokyo. One report suggests that Japanese authorities are working on plans to transform Tokyo but have met with mixed success, noting that "initial drafts suggest that Japan's economic specialists are having trouble figuring out the secret of the Western financial centres' success." Efforts include more English-speaking restaurants and services and the building of many new office buildings in Tokyo, but more powerful stimuli such as lower taxes have been neglected and a relative aversion to finance remains prevalent in Japan. Tokyo emerged as a major financial centre in the 1980s as the Japanese economy became one of the largest in the world, but then declined due to the Lost Decades . As a financial centre, Tokyo has good links with New York City and London.

=== Major IMF OFCs ===
These centres appear in all FSF–IMF lists of OFCs and, except for the Caribbean OFCs of the Cayman Islands, the British Virgin Islands, and Bermuda, represent all the major OFCs. Some also appear as RFCs in various lists, particularly Hong Kong, and Singapore. They also appear on most lists of major tax havens, and on lists of the largest Conduit and Sink OFCs in the world.

- Amsterdam. Amsterdam is well known for the size of its pension fund market. It is also a centre for banking and trading activities. Amsterdam was a prominent financial centre in Europe in the 17th and 18th centuries and several of the innovations developed there were transported to London. In June 2017, a study published in Nature ranked the Netherlands as the world's largest Conduit OFC, a term used to describe the re-routing of fund flows to tax havens. Additionally, after the UK's departure from the European Union, Amsterdam became Europe's largest share trading centre but was quickly overtaken by London again.
- Dublin. Dublin (via its International Financial Services Centre, "IFSC"), is a specialised financial services centre with a focus on fund administration and domiciling, fund management, custodial activities and aircraft leasing. It is the largest securitisation location in the EU-27, and the second largest domicile for investment funds, particularly alternative investment funds, after Luxembourg. Many of the funds domiciled and managed in Dublin are at the instruction of investment managers in larger Asset Management jurisdictions such as London, Frankfurt, New York and Luxembourg. Dublin's advanced BEPS tax tools, for example the double Irish, the single malt, and the capital allowances for intangible assets ("CAIA") tools, have led the economist Gabriel Zucman to judge Ireland to be the largest corporate tax haven by virtue of its use as a conduit OFC.
- Hong Kong. As a financial centre, Hong Kong has strong links with London and New York City. It developed its financial services industry while a British territory, and its present legal system, defined in Hong Kong Basic Law, is based on common law. In 1997, Hong Kong became a Special Administrative Region of the People's Republic of China, retaining its laws and a high degree of autonomy for at least 50 years after the transfer. Most of the world's 100 largest banks have a presence in the city. Hong Kong is a leading location for initial public offerings, competing with New York City, and also for merger and acquisition activity.
- Luxembourg. Luxembourg is a specialised financial services centre that is the largest location for investment fund domiciliation in Europe, and second in the world after the United States. Many of the funds domiciled in Luxembourg are managed in London. Luxembourg is the leading private banking centre in the Eurozone and the largest captive reinsurance centre in Europe. 143 banks from 28 countries are established in Luxembourg. The country is also the third largest renminbi centre in the world by numbers, in certain activities such as deposits, loans, bond listing and investment funds. Three of the largest Chinese banks have their European hub in Luxembourg (ICBC, Bank of China, China Construction Bank).
- Singapore. With its strong links with London, Singapore has developed into the Asia region's largest centre for foreign exchange and commodity trading, as well as a growing wealth management hub. Other than Tokyo, it is one of the main centres for fixed income trading in Asia. However, the market capitalisation of its stock exchange has been falling since 2014 and several major companies plan to delist.
- Zurich. Zurich is a significant centre for banking, asset management including provision of alternative investment products, and insurance. Since Switzerland is not a member of the European Union, Zurich is not directly subject to EU regulation.

=== Major IMF RFCs ===
In some lists, RFCs such as Paris, Frankfurt, Chicago, and Shanghai appear as IFCs; however, they do not appear in all lists. They are certainly major RFCs.

- Chicago. The Illinois city has the "world's largest [exchange-traded] derivatives market" since the Chicago Mercantile Exchange and the Chicago Board of Trade merged in 2007, under the CME Group.
- Dubai. The second largest emirate in the United Arab Emirates is a growing centre for finance in the Middle East, including for Islamic finance. Its emergence as a financial centre is relatively recent, although commercial banking activity in the UAE became established in the second half of the 20th century (the first commercial bank in Dubai was British Bank of the Middle East in 1946, and the first domestic commercial bank was the National Bank of Dubai established in 1963).

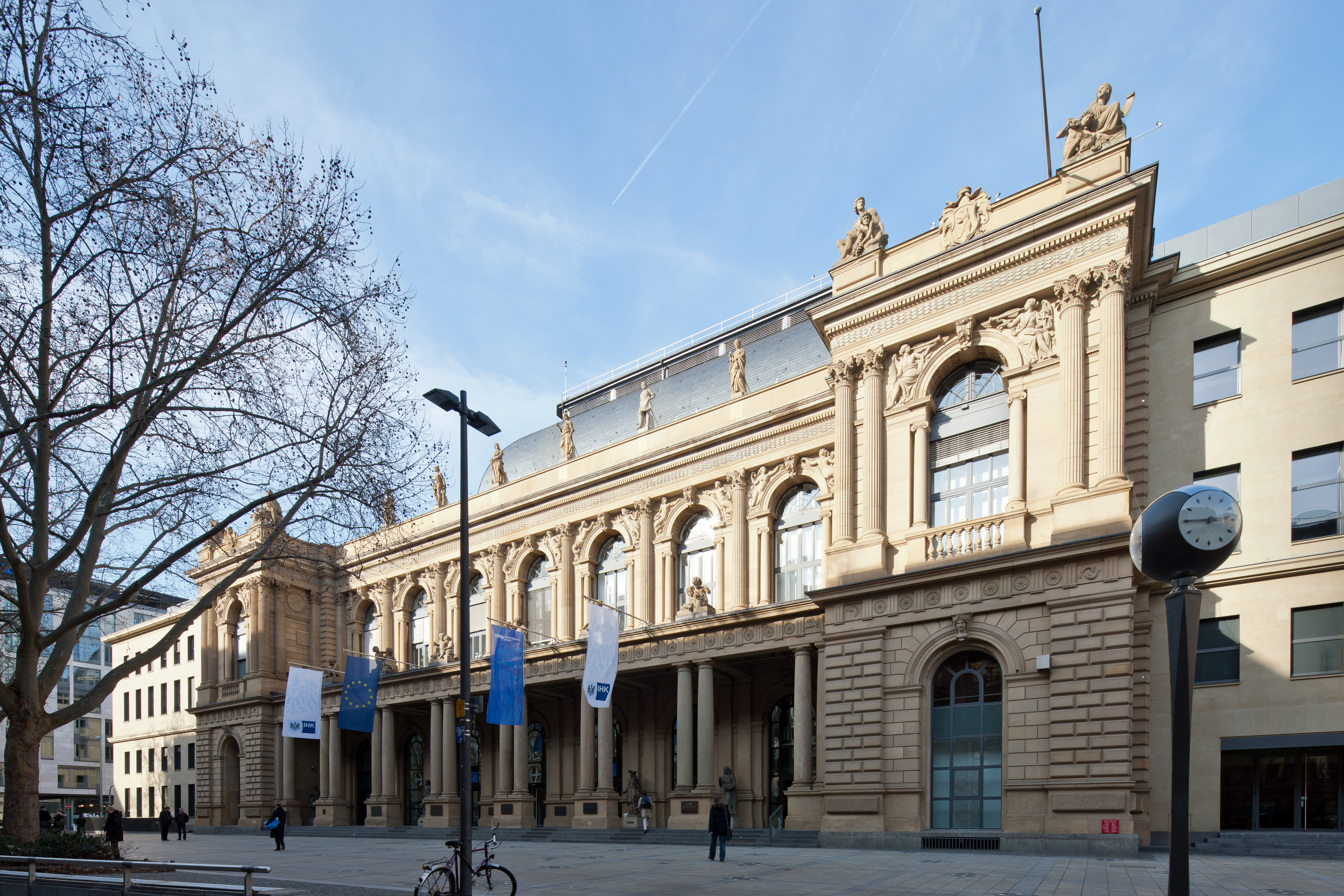
The Frankfurt Stock Exchange building, which dates back to 1879

- Frankfurt. Frankfurt attracts many foreign banks which maintain offices in the city. It is the seat of Deutsche Börse, one of the leading stock exchanges and derivatives markets operators, and the European Central Bank, which sets the monetary policy for the single European currency, the euro; in addition, in 2014 the European Central Bank became the central institution of European Banking Supervision for the 18 countries which form the Eurozone. It is also the seat of Deutsche Bundesbank, the German central bank, as well as of EIOPA, the EU's supervisory authority for insurances and occupational pension systems.

Frankfurt has been the financial centre of Germany since the second half of the 20th century as it was before the mid-19th century. Berlin held the position during the intervening period, focusing on lending to European countries while London focused on lending to the Americas and Asia.

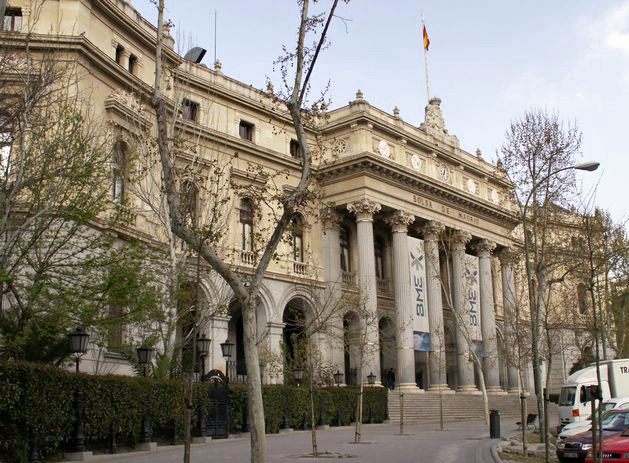
Bolsa de Madrid. Madrid's stock exchange is the world's second-largest in number of listed companies.

- Madrid. Madrid is the headquarters to the Spanish company Bolsas y Mercados Españoles, which owns the four stock exchanges in Spain, the largest being the Bolsa de Madrid. Trading of equities, derivatives and fixed income securities are linked through the Madrid-based electronic Spanish Stock Market Interconnection System (SIBE), handling more than 90% of all financial transactions. Madrid ranks fourth in European equities market capitalisation, and Madrid's stock exchange is second in terms of number of listed companies, just behind New York Stock Exchange (NYSE plus NASDAQ). As a financial centre, Madrid has extensive links with Latin America and acts as a gateway for many Latin American financial firms to access the EU banking and financial markets.

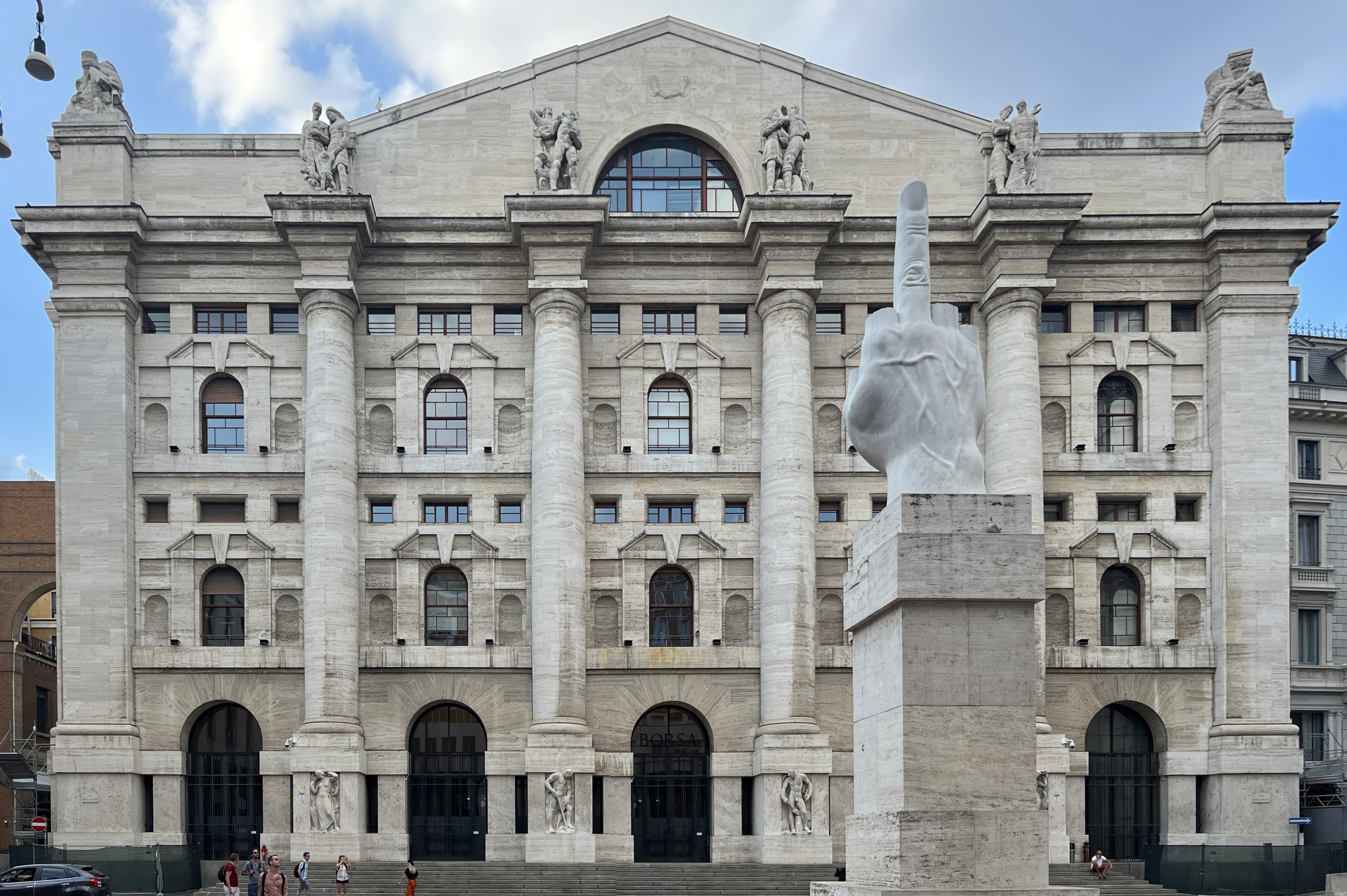
The seat of Borsa Italiana, Palazzo Mezzanotte

- Milan. Italy's main centre of banking and finance. It hosts the Borsa Italiana stock exchange, one of the larger stock exchanges in Europe, which is now part of Euronext.
- Paris. Alongside equity trading on the Paris Stock Exchange, there is futures and options trading, insurance, corporate banking and asset management taking place in Paris. The city is home to the Banque de France and the European Securities and Markets Authority. Paris has been a major financial centre since the 19th century. The European Banking Authority also moved to Paris from London in March 2019 following Brexit.
- Seoul. South Korea's capital has developed significantly as a financial centre since the late-2000s recession. In 2009, Seoul ranked 53rd among global financial centres; by 2012, Seoul had risen to number 9. Seoul has continued to build office space with the completion of the International Financial Center Seoul in 2013. It ranked 7th in the 2015 Global Financial Centres Index, recording the highest growth in rating among the top ten cities.

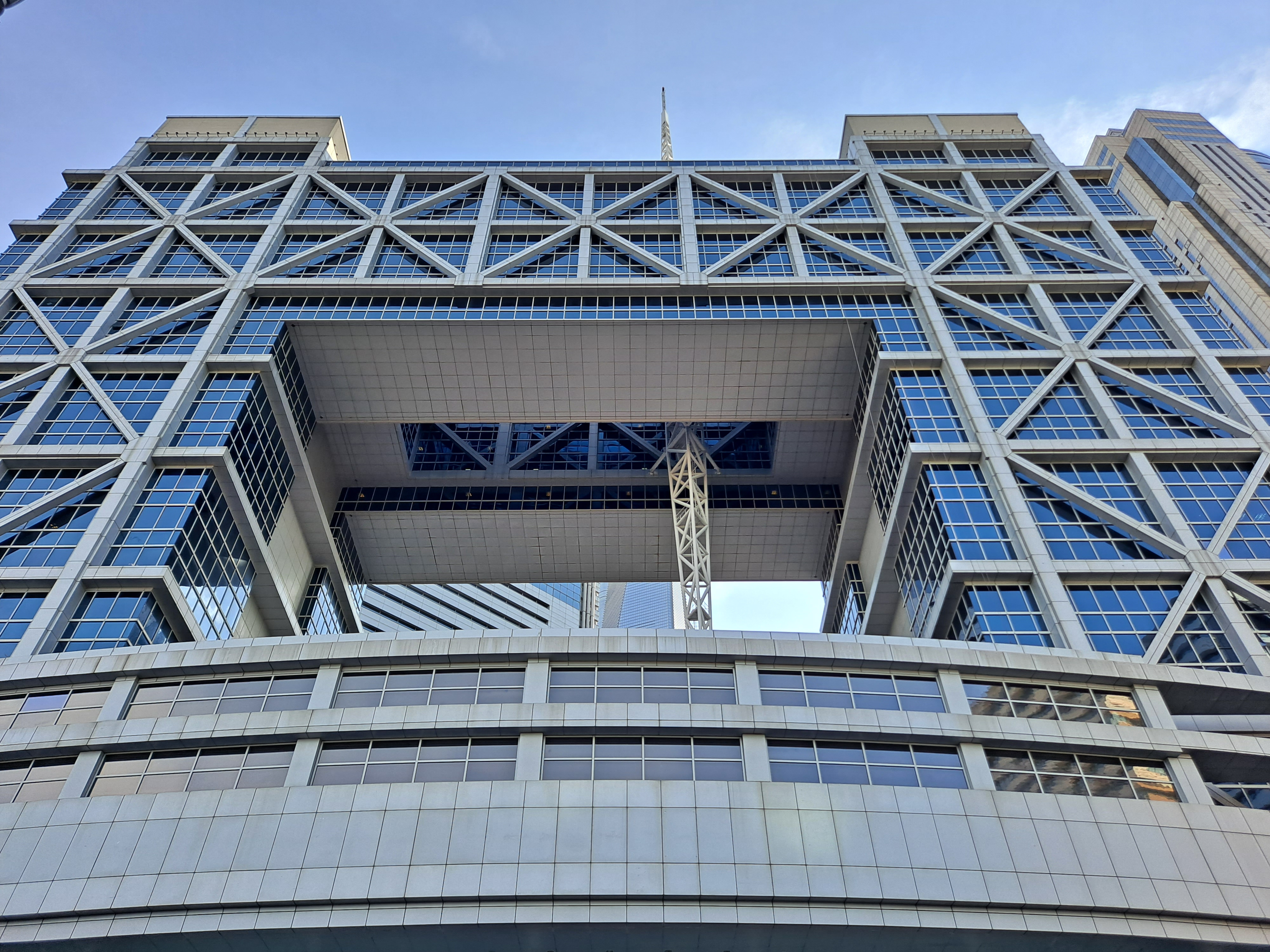
Shanghai Stock Exchange building at Pudong

- Shanghai. Official efforts have been directed to making Pudong a financial leader by 2010. Efforts during the 1990s were mixed, but in the early 21st century, Shanghai gained ground. Factors such as a "protective banking sector" and a "highly restricted capital market" have held the city back, according to a 2009 opinion piece in China Daily. Shanghai has done well in terms of market capitalisation but it needs to "attract an army of money managers, lawyers, accountants, actuaries, brokers and other professionals, Chinese and foreign" to enable it to compete with New York and London. China is generating tremendous new capital, which makes it easier to stage initial public offerings of state-owned companies in places like Shanghai.

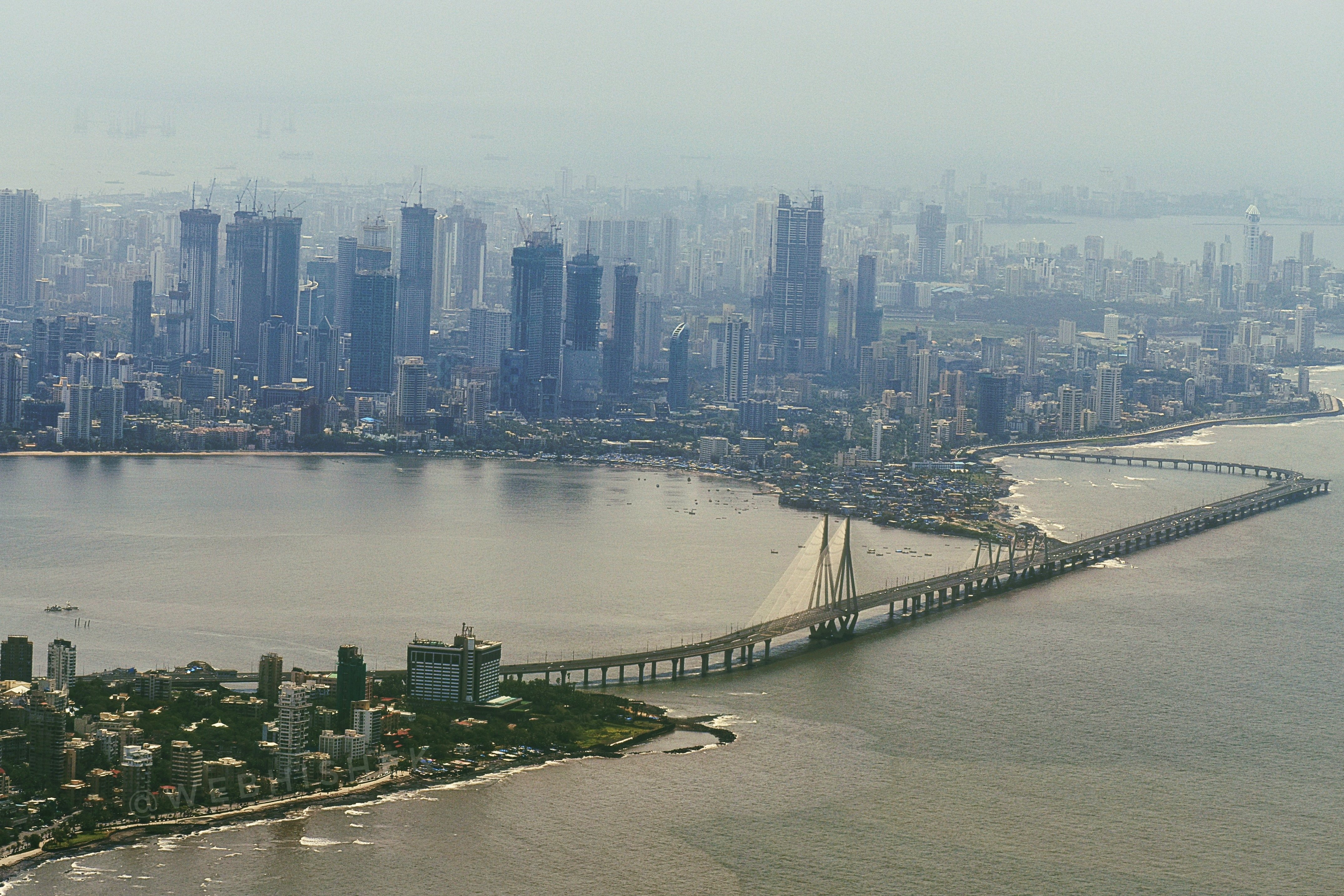
The CBD of Mumbai viewed from the Arabian Sea. Also seen is the Bandra - Worli Sea Link.

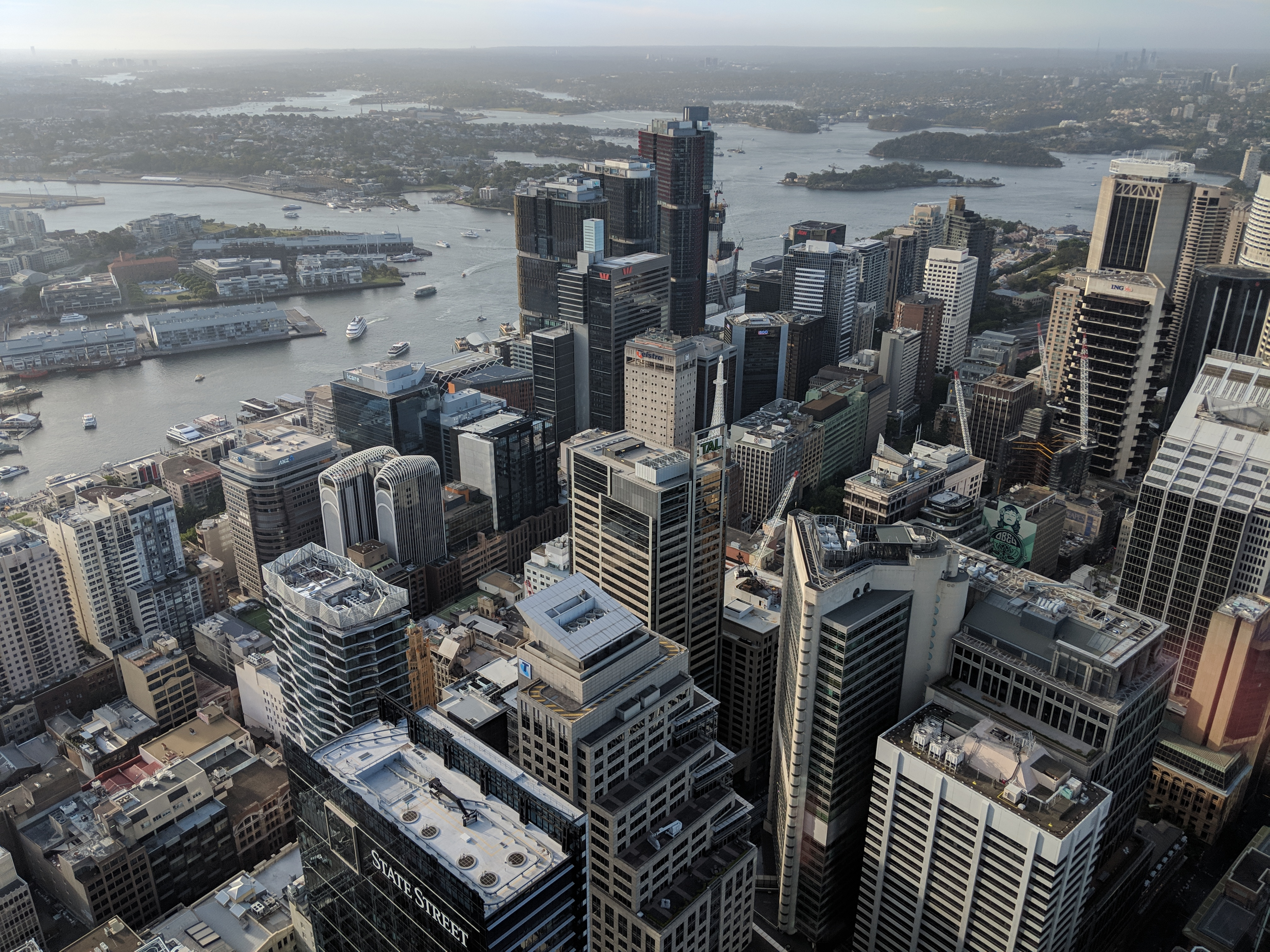
Sydney's northern CBD serves as the financial and banking hub of the city.

- Sydney. Australia's most populous city is a financial and business services hub not only for Australia but for the Asia-Pacific region. Sydney competes quite closely with other Asia Pacific hubs; however, it concentrates a greater portion of Australian-based business in terms of clients and services. Sydney is home to two of Australia's four largest banks, the Commonwealth Bank of Australia and Westpac Banking Corporation, both headquartered in the Sydney CBD. Sydney is also home to 12 of the top 15 asset managers in Australia. Melbourne, on the other hand, tends to concentrate more of the Australian superannuation funds (pension funds). Sydney is using the large Barangaroo development project on its harbour to further position itself as an Asian Pacific hub. Sydney is also home to the Australian Securities Exchange and an array of brokerage banks which are either headquartered or regionally based in Sydney, including Australia's largest investment bank Macquarie Group.
- Toronto. The city is a leading market for Canada's largest financial institutions and large insurance companies. It has also become one of the fastest growing financial centres following the late-2000s recession, helped by the stability of the Canadian banking system. Most of the financial industry is concentrated along Bay Street, where the Toronto Stock Exchange is also located.
- Mumbai. The city serves as India’s premier financial centre largely due to its concentration of capital-markets infrastructure and corporate headquarters. The city hosts the Bombay Stock Exchange (BSE) and the National Stock Exchange (NSE), making it a critical node for equity trading and underwriting in the country.
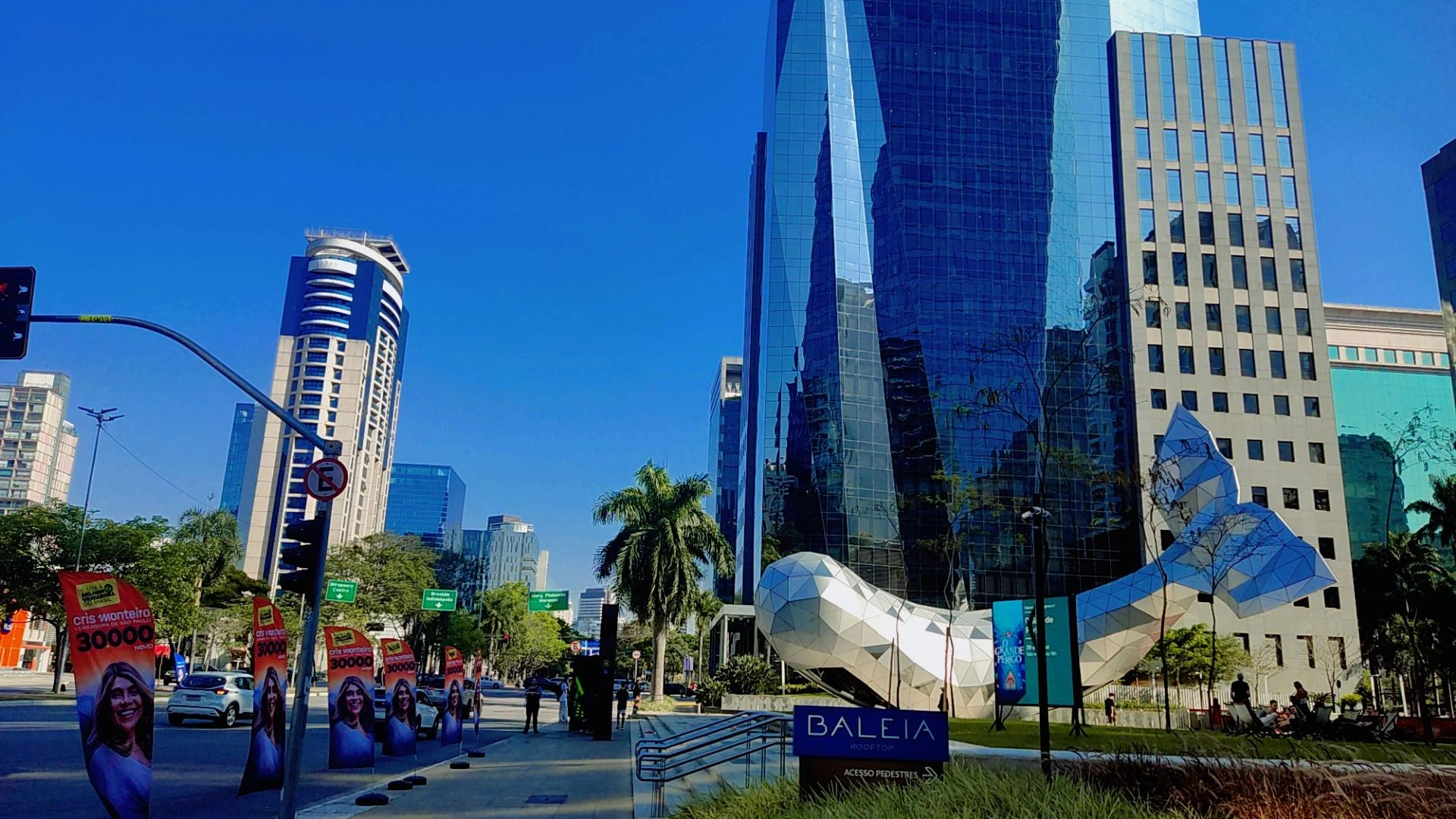
  Avenida Brigadeiro Faria Lima, in São Paulo, the largest financial hub in Latin America
- Others. Cities such as São Paulo, Mexico City and Johannesburg and other "would-be hubs" lack liquidity and the "skills base", according to one source. Financial industries in countries and regions such as the Indian Subcontinent and Malay Archipelago require not only well-trained people but the "whole institutional infrastructure of laws, regulations, contracts, trust and disclosure" which takes time to happen.

== History ==
Primitive financial centres evolved in the 11th century in the Kingdom of England at the annual fair of St. Giles and in the Kingdom of Germany at the Frankfurt autumn fair, then developed in medieval France during the Champaign Fairs.

=== Italian city-states ===
The first real international financial centre was the city state of Venice which slowly emerged from the 9th century to its peak in the 14th century. Tradable bonds as a commonly used type of security, were invented by the Italian city-states (such as Venice and Genoa) of the late medieval and early Renaissance periods while Florence can be said to be the birthplace of double-entry bookkeeping from the publication and proliferation of the work of Luca Pacioli.

=== The Low Countries ===
In the sixteenth century, the overall economic supremacy of the Italian city-states gradually waned, and the centre of financial activities in Europe shifted to the Low Countries, first to Bruges, and later to Antwerp and Amsterdam which acted as Entrepôt cities. They also became important centres of financial innovation, capital accumulation and investment. By the early 1800s, London replaced Amsterdam as the world's leading financial centre.

=== 19th–21st centuries ===
London and Paris were the world's only prominent financial centres throughout most of the 19th century. After 1870, Berlin and New York grew to become major financial centres mainly serving their national economies. An array of smaller international financial centres found market niches, such as Amsterdam, Brussels, Zurich, and Geneva. London was the leading international financial centre in the four decades before World War I. Since then, New York and London have developed leading positions in different activities and some non-Western financial centres have grown in prominence, notably Tokyo, Hong Kong, Singapore and Shanghai.

==== Rise of London ====
London has been a leading international financial centre since the 19th century, acting as a centre of lending and investment around the world. The Bank of England, founded as a private bank in 1694, took on the role of a central bank with the Bank Charter Act 1844. Financial institutions located there provided services internationally such as Lloyd's of London, founded in 1686, for insurance and the Baltic Exchange, founded in 1744, for shipping. English contract law was adopted widely for international finance, with legal services provided in London. During the 20th century London played an important role in the development of new financial products such as the Eurodollar and Eurobonds in the 1960s, international asset management and international equities trading in the 1980s, and derivatives in the 1990s. Long standing as the world's largest currency trading hub, today London accounts for over a third of global forex trading.

==== Rise of New York ====
The Federal Reserve System was created in 1913 by the Federal Reserve Act after a series of financial crises, particularly the panic of 1907, led to the desire for central control of the monetary system. Since the middle of the 20th century, New York City, represented by Wall Street in Manhattan's Financial District, has been described as a leading financial centre. Over the past few decades, with the rise of a multipolar world with new regional powers and global capitalism, numerous financial centres have challenged Wall Street, particularly London, and several in Asia, which some analysts believe will be the focus of new worldwide growth. In 2018, New York was described as extending its lead as the world's centre of finance due to the value of domestic and international financial activity like managing assets and issuing equity, which underscores the position of New York as the world's leading financial centre. A recent source has shown London narrowing the gap between the two cities.

==== Rise of Asian centres ====
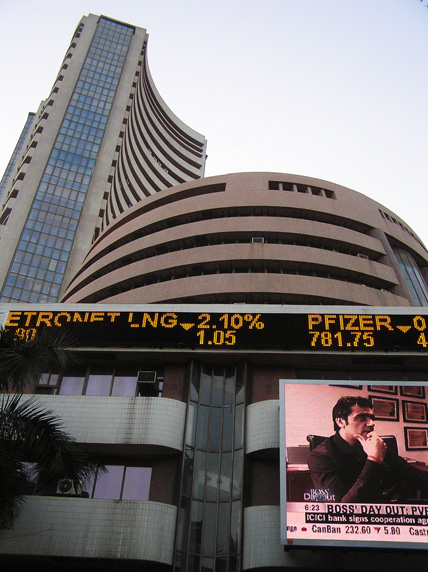
The Bombay Stock Exchange is the largest in India and one of the largest in the world.

In Asia, Tokyo emerged as a major financial centre in the 1980s as the Japanese economy became one of the largest in the world. Hong Kong and Singapore developed soon after leveraging their links with London and Britain. In the 21st century, other centres have grown including Sydney, Seoul, Shanghai and Astana. Astana International Financial Centre has become the fastest growing financial hub in Central Asia. Dubai has become a centre for finance in the Middle East, including for Islamic finance. The rapid rise of India has enabled Mumbai to become an emerging financial centre. India is also making an International Financial Centre GIFT City from scratch. GIFT city is now functional and has already won the crown of fastest emerging International Finance Centre of South Asia. Linked to the rise of these new IFCs, has seen the rise of "partner OFCs" (offshore tax-havens to which funds are routed), such as Taiwan (a major Sink OFC for Asia, and 7th largest global Sink OFC), Mauritius (a major Sink OFC for South Asia, especially India, and Africa, and the 9th largest global Sink OFC).

Africa's largest financial centre is Johannesburg is it the home to Africa's largest stock exchange JSE with a market cap of approximately $1.2 tn.

The private nationwide financial system in China was first developed by the Shanxi merchants, with the creation of so-called "draft banks". The first draft bank Rishengchang was created in 1823 in Pingyao. Some large draft banks had branches in Russia, Mongolia and Japan to facilitate the international trade. Throughout the nineteenth century, the central Shanxi region became the de facto financial centres of Qing China. With the fall of Qing Dynasty, the financial centres gradually shifted to Shanghai, mainly due to its geographical location at the estuary of the Yangtze River and to the control of customs in China. After the establishment of People's Republic of China, the financial centres in China today are Beijing, Shanghai, and Shenzhen.

== See also ==
- Global city
- Corporate tax haven
- Financial capital
- Financial Development Index
- Geography of finance
- Global financial system
- Nylonkong
- Conduit and Sink OFCs
- Financial district
