= Global city =

City important to the world economy

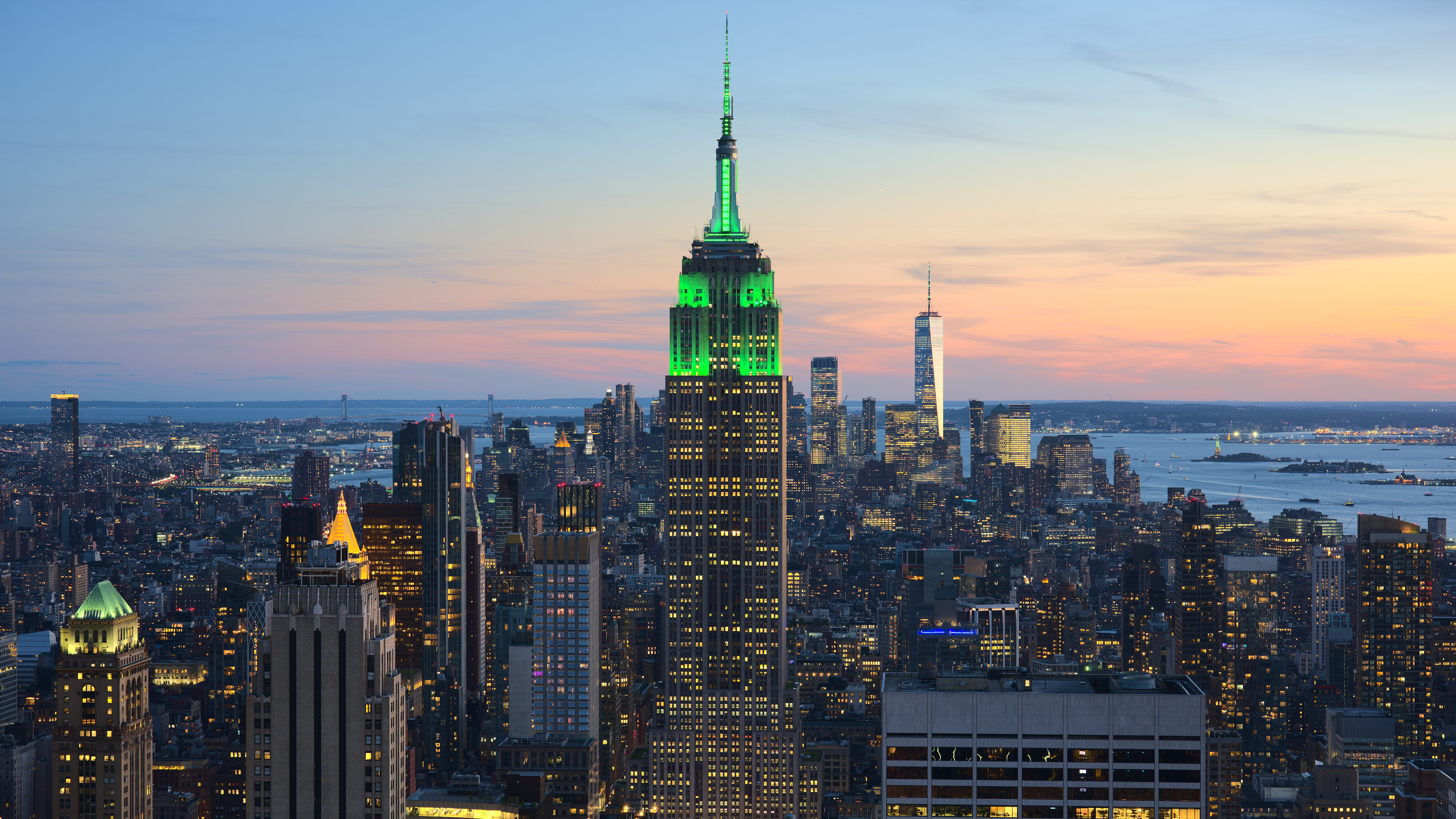

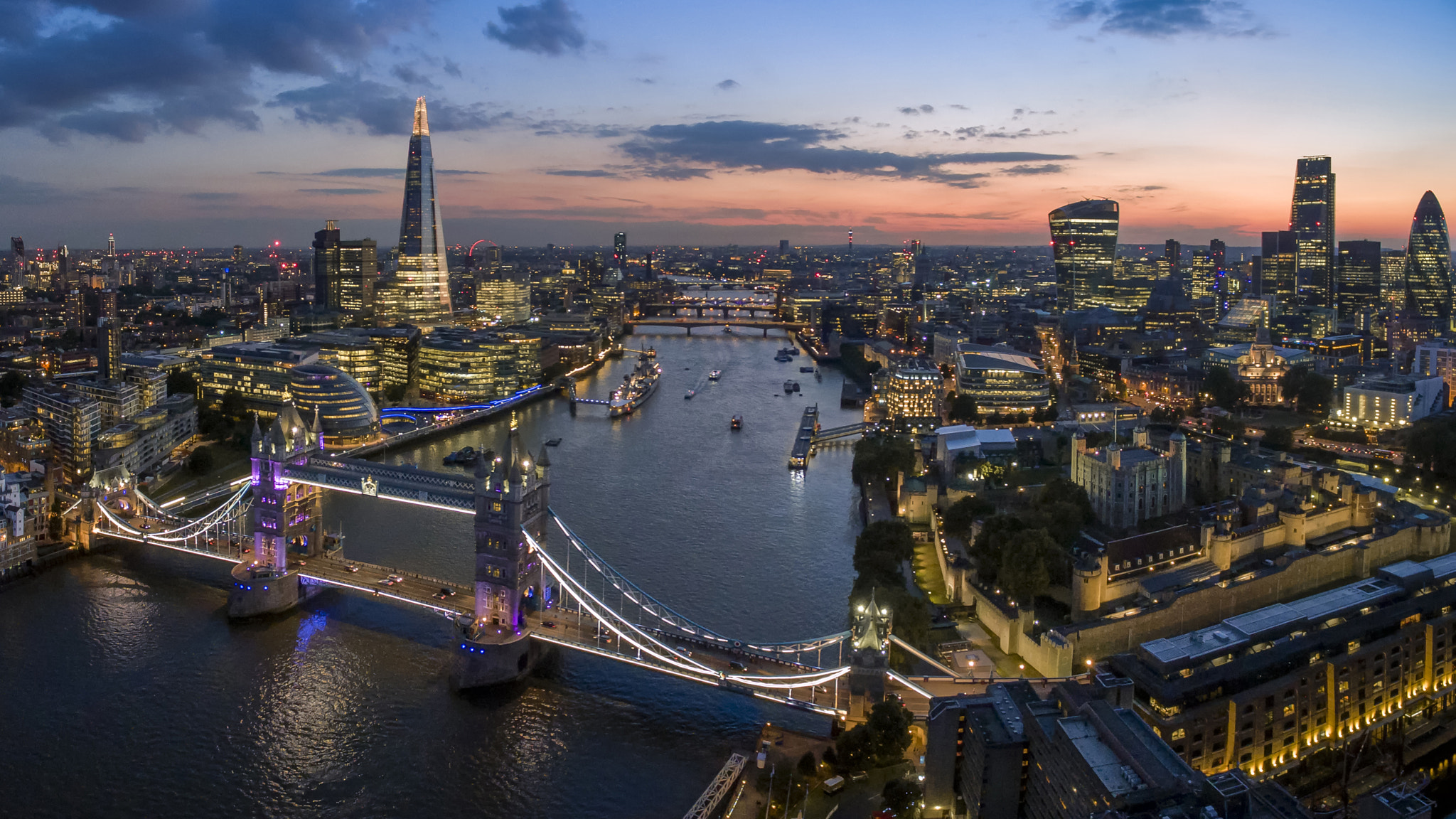
New York City (top) and London (bottom) are the only two cities ranked in the Alpha ++ category by the Globalization and World Cities Research Network. Both cities are considered leading business, financial, commercial, and cultural centers.

A global city (also known as a power city, world city, alpha city, or world center) is a city that serves as a primary node in the global economic network. The concept originates from geography and urban studies, based on the thesis that globalization has created a hierarchy of strategic geographic locations with varying degrees of influence over finance, trade, and culture worldwide. The global city represents the most complex and significant hub within the international system, characterized by links binding it to other cities that have direct, tangible effects on global socioeconomic affairs.

The criteria of a global city vary depending on the source. Common features include a high degree of urban development, a large population, the presence of major multinational companies, a significant and globalized financial sector, a well-developed and internationally linked transportation infrastructure, local or national economic dominance, high quality educational and research institutions, and a globally influential output of ideas, innovations, or cultural products. Global city rankings are numerous. New York City, London, Tokyo, and Paris are the most commonly mentioned.

== Origin and terminology ==
The term global city was popularized by sociologist Saskia Sassen in her 1991 book, The Global City: New York, London, Tokyo. Before then, other terms were used for urban centers with roughly the same features. The term 'world city', meaning a city heavily involved in global trade, appeared in a May 1886 description of Liverpool, by The Illustrated London News; British sociologist and geographer Patrick Geddes used the term in 1915. The term 'megacity' entered common use in the late 19th or early 20th century, the earliest known example being a publication by the University of Texas in 1904. In the 21st century, the terms are usually focused on a city's financial power and high technology infrastructure.

== Criteria ==
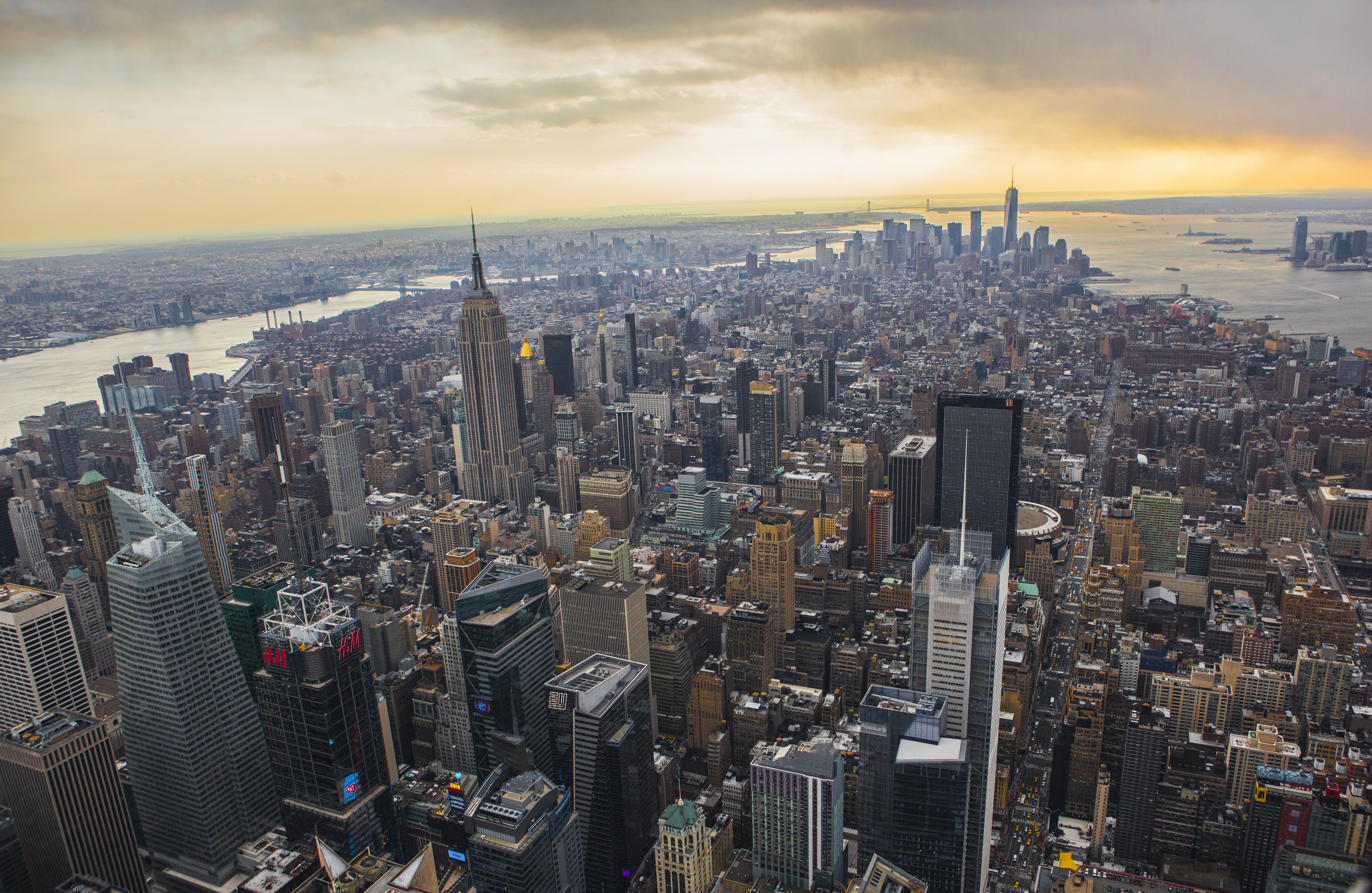
Manhattan, the core area of New York City, an Alpha++ global city, where there are several characteristic elements of global cities like worldwide influential economic (New York Stock Exchange) and cultural (Broadway) centers, headquarters of international political organizations (UN headquarters), world renowned museums (the Met Museum, MOMA, Guggenheim Museum), and worldwide-known landmarks (Times Square, Empire State Building, Central Park)

Competing groups have devised competing means to classify and rank world cities and to distinguish them from other cities. Although there is a consensus on the leading world cities, the chosen criteria affect which other cities are included. Selection criteria may be based on a yardstick value (e.g., if the producer-service sector is the largest sector then city X is a world city) or on an imminent determination (if the producer-service sector of city X is greater than the combined producer-service sectors of N other cities then city X is a world city.) Although criteria are variable and fluid, typical characteristics of world cities include:

- The most prominent criterion has been providing a variety of international financial services, notably in finance, insurance, real estate, banking, accountancy, and marketing; and their amalgamation of financial headquarters, a stock exchange, and other major financial institutions,
- Headquarters of numerous multinational corporations,
- Domination of the trade and economy of a large surrounding area,
- Major manufacturing centers with port and container facilities,
- Considerable decision-making power daily and at a global level,
- Centers of new ideas and innovation in business, economics, and culture,
- Centers of digital and other media and communications for global networks,
- The dominance of the national region with great international significance,
- The high percentage of residents employed in the services sector and information sector,
- High-quality educational institutions, including renowned universities and research facilities; and attracting international student attendance,
- Multi-functional infrastructure offering some of the best legal, medical, and entertainment facilities in the country,
- High diversity in language, culture, religion, and ideologies.

== Rankings ==
=== GaWC World Cities ===
The Globalization and World Cities Research Network (GaWC) is a British think tank that studies the relationships between world cities in the context of globalization. It is based in the geography department of Loughborough University in Leicestershire, United Kingdom. GaWC was founded by Peter J. Taylor in 1998. Primarily concerned with what it calls the "advanced producer services" of accountancy, advertising, banking/finance, and law, the cities in the top two classifications in the 2024 edition are:

==== Alpha ++ ====
- (United Kingdom) London
- (United States) New York City

==== Alpha + ====
- (China) Beijing
- (United Arab Emirates) Dubai
- Hong Kong
- (France) Paris
- (China) Shanghai
- Singapore
- (Australia) Sydney
- (Japan) Tokyo

=== Global Cities Index (Kearney) ===
In 2008, the American journal Foreign Policy, working with the consulting firm A.T. Kearney and the Chicago Council on Global Affairs, published a ranking of global cities based on consultation with Saskia Sassen, Witold Rybczynski, and others. The ranking is based on 27 metrics across five dimensions: business activity, human capital, information exchange, cultural experience, and political engagement. The top ranked cities in 2025 are:

1. (United States) New York City
2. (United Kingdom) London
3. (France) Paris
4. (Japan) Tokyo
5. Singapore
6. (China) Beijing
7. Hong Kong
8. (China) Shanghai
9. (United States) Los Angeles
10. (United States) Chicago

=== Global Cities Index (Oxford Economics) ===
Advisory firm Oxford Economics ranks the world's largest 1,000 cities based on 27 indicators across five categories (economics, human capital, quality of life, environment, and governance) with more weight on economic factors. The top ranked cities in 2025 are:

1. (United States) New York City
2. (United Kingdom) London
3. (France) Paris
4. (United States) San Jose
5. (United States) Seattle
6. (Australia) Melbourne
7. (Australia) Sydney
8. (United States) Boston
9. (Japan) Tokyo
10. (United States) San Francisco

=== Global Power City Index ===
The Tokyo-based Institute for Urban Strategies at The Mori Memorial Foundation first published a study of global cities in 2008. They are ranked in six categories: economy, research and development, cultural interaction, livability, environment, and accessibility. The top 10 cities in 2025 are:

1. (United Kingdom) London
2. (Japan) Tokyo
3. (United States) New York City
4. (France) Paris
5. Singapore
6. (South Korea) Seoul
7. (Netherlands) Amsterdam
8. (China) Shanghai
9. (United Arab Emirates) Dubai
10. (Germany) Berlin

=== World's Best Cities ranking ===
Consultancy firm Resonance publishes the World's Best Cities ranking. They are ranked in three categories: livability, lovability and prosperity, each of them using different factors. The top 10 cities in 2026 are:

1. (United Kingdom) London
2. (United States) New York City
3. (France) Paris
4. (Japan) Tokyo
5. (Spain) Madrid
6. Singapore
7. (Italy) Rome
8. (United Arab Emirates) Dubai
9. (Germany) Berlin
10. (Spain) Barcelona

=== Global Financial Centres Index ===
The Global Financial Centres Index (GFCI) ranks the competitiveness of financial centres based on over 29,000 assessments from an online questionnaire and over 100 indices from organisations such as the World Bank, the Organisation for Economic Co-operation and Development (OECD), and the Economist Intelligence Unit. It was first published in March 2007. It has been jointly published twice per year by the London-based think tank Z/Yen and the China Development Institute since 2015. It is widely quoted as a top source for ranking financial centres.

The 2026 ranking was:

1. (United States) New York City
2. (United Kingdom) London
3. Hong Kong
4. Singapore
5. (China) Shanghai
6. (Japan) Tokyo
7. (South Korea) Seoul
8. (China) Shenzhen
9. (United Arab Emirates) Dubai
10. (Switzerland) Zurich

== See also ==
- Caput Mundi
- City quality of life indices
- Ecumenopolis
- List of cities by GDP
- Ranally city rating system
