= Michael Mainelli =

695th Lord Mayor of London (born 1958)

Alderman Michael Mainelli KStJ OMRI
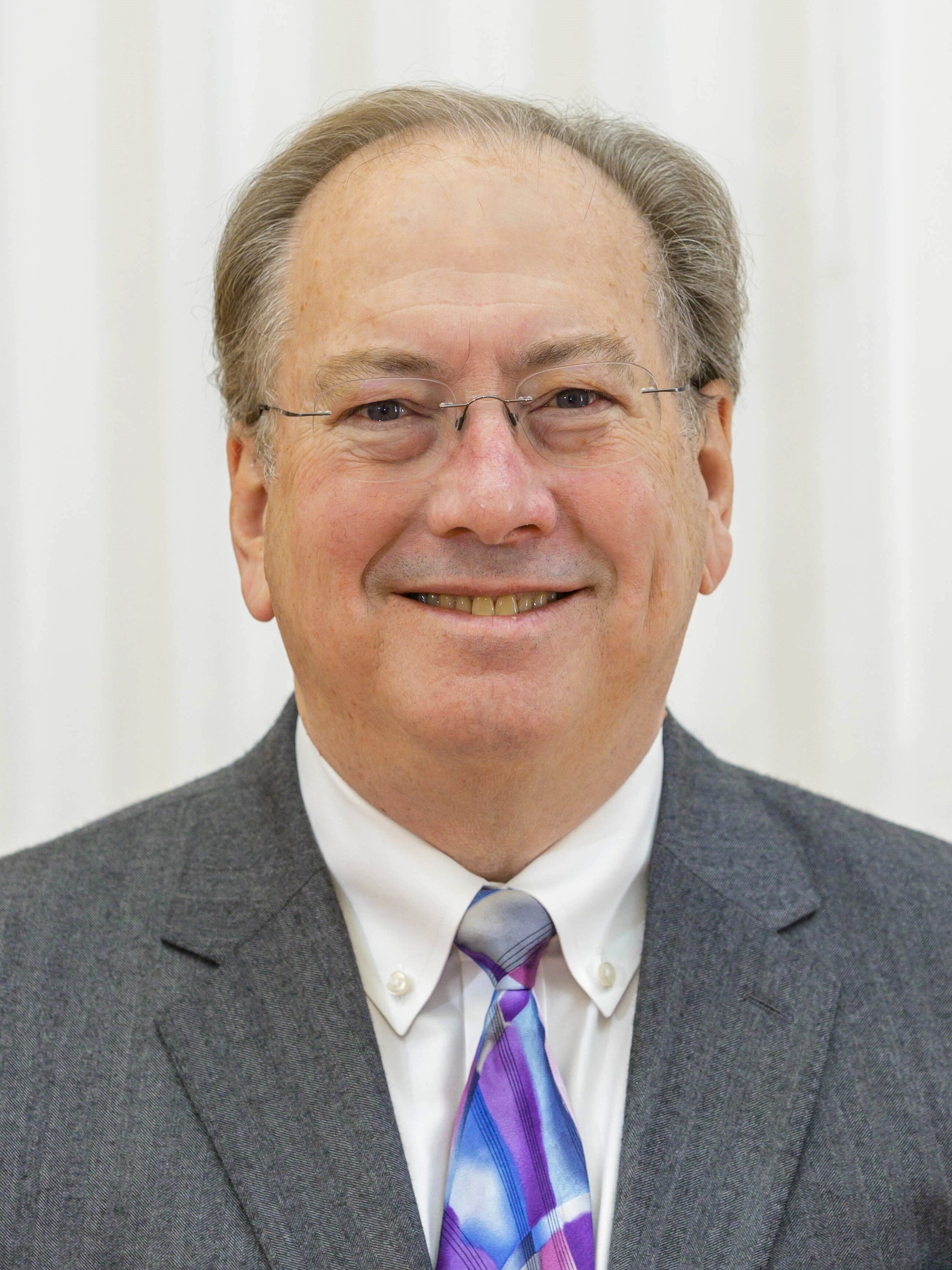
- Mainelli in 2023

695th Lord Mayor of the City of London
- In office 10 November 2023 – 8 November 2024
- Preceded by: Sir Nicholas Lyons
- Succeeded by: Alastair King

Sheriff of the City of London
- In office 27 September 2019 – 1 October 2021
- Preceded by: Vincent Keaveny
- Succeeded by: Sir Nicholas Lyons

Personal details
- Born: Michael Raymond Mainelli; 19 December 1958 (age 67) Seattle, Washington, U.S.
- Spouse: Elisabeth Reuß (m. 1996)
- Children: 3
- Education: Bishop Moore High School, Orlando, Florida
- Alma mater: Harvard University (BA); Trinity College Dublin; London School of Economics (MPhil, PhD)
- Occupation: Chartered accountant; Management consultant
- Awards: KStJ; OMRI
- Website: mainelli.org

Michael Raymond Mainelli KStJ OMRI (born 19 December 1958) is an American-born British scientist, economist, and accountant, known for being Chairman of Z/Yen, Sheriff of the City of London for 2019–21, and the 695th Lord Mayor of the City of London for 2023/24.

An Emeritus Professor of Commerce of Gresham College, and founder of the Long Finance initiative, Mainelli has been Alderman for Broad Street Ward in the City of London since 4 July 2013, and was elected Sheriff on 24 June 2019, serving for two terms.

== Early life and education ==
His mother, Katherine (née Smith), and father, Michael Mainelli, are Irish American and Italian American respectively, and his paternal grandmother is of German descent. His father worked as a mechanical engineer, and at one time was a project manager on the Apollo capsule for Boeing.

From 1973 to 1977, Mainelli attended Bishop Moore High School in Orlando, Florida where he was first introduced to computing and spent three summers working as a programmer for Martin Marietta on missile guidance systems.

Mainelli attended Harvard University where he was a resident of Dunster House and graduated with a BA degree in Government in 1984, including a year reading Engineering and Mathematics at Trinity College Dublin (1980/81). Mainelli later completed an MPhil (1997) and PhD (2004) at the London School of Economics in chaotic systems with a doctoral thesis titled Development of a risk-reward meta-methodology, under the supervision of Ian Angell.

== Career ==
=== Early career ===
Mainelli's early research in aerospace and computer graphics at the Harvard Laboratory for Computer Graphics and Spatial Analysis led him to start Swiss companies in seismology, cartography, and energy information for Petroconsultants, an oil and gas information services company, from 1979 to 1984. He produced Mundocart, a complete 1:1,000,000 digital map of the world for use in petroleum mapping in 1983, while directing the Geodat cartography project. Mainelli left Petroconsultants in 1985, and joined Arthur Andersen a year later as a senior manager. He later became a senior partner and board member of the accountancy firm BDO Binder Hamlyn from 1987 to 1995.

While co-founding Z/Yen in 1994, Mainelli pursued merchant banking with Deutsche Morgan Grenfell and was Corporate Development Director at the UK Ministry of Defence's Defence Evaluation and Research Agency (now largely Qinetiq and the Defence Science and Technology Laboratory). At Z/Yen, Mainelli established the Global Financial Centres Index, the London Accord, Long Finance, the Global Intellectual Property Index, the Global Green Finance Index, the Smart Centres Index, the Farsight Award, and other financial services initiatives. His area of current research includes Distributed Futures and he speaks on his research on 'smart ledgers' (aka blockchains) as well as other technologies.

=== Present day ===
A Fellow and Trustee of Gresham College, Mainelli is a visiting professor of UCL's Bartlett School of Sustainable Construction, Honorary Fellow of King's College London, an Economic and Business Faculty Fellow of Goodenough College, and a former Visiting Professor of the London School of Economics. He is the current Chairman of Z/Yen Group. In 2005 Mainelli, in conjunction with Gresham College, the City of London Corporation and financial institutions, launched Long Finance's London Accord, an agreement to share environmental, social and governance research with policy makers and the public. Mainelli has lectured on new concepts of money and the role of government, publishing 28 one-hour Gresham lectures, while serving as Professor of Commerce from 2005 to 2009. The theme of his programme was "Society’s Commercial Choice – Risks and Rewards of Markets".

Mainelli is a chartered certified accountant (FCCA), computer specialist (FBCS, CITP), securities professional (Hon. FCSI) and management consultant (FIMC, CMC). He is a non-executive Director of the United Kingdom Accreditation Service and Wishbone Gold plc, an AIM-quoted company. He has been an international member of the International Financial Services Industry Advisory Committee to the Office of the Taoiseach – Dublin, Ireland since 2015. In 2015 he was elected a Consigliere del Senato Accademico of L’Accademia Tiberina. In 2020, having served as a Trustee from 2008, he received Honorary Life Fellowship of Gresham College. He has held advisory posts at City, University of London, Hitachi UK, and HM Treasury. Mainelli was elected an Honorary Bencher of Middle Temple in February 2023, and was appointed President of the London Chamber of Commerce & Industry on 15 January 2025.

== City of London ==
=== Aldermanic and Shrieval career ===
First elected Alderman for Broad Street Ward on the City of London Corporation in 2013, Mainelli is a Past Master of the Worshipful Company of World Traders (for 2017–18), and an Honorary Liveryman of the Furniture Makers', Water Conservators', Marketors', Tax Advisers', Management Consultants', Security Professionals', Engineers', Chartered Architects', Playing Card Makers', International Bankers', and Scientific Instrument Makers' Companies, an Honorary Freeman of the Educators' Company, the Entrepreneurs, and the Information Technologists. A Craft-Owning Freeman of the Company of Watermen and Lightermen, he is also the sponsoring Alderman for the Company of Communicators in their process of obtaining full livery status. On the 19 December 2024, Mainelli was elected to a third term as Alderman for Broad Street Ward.

Mainelli was elected Sheriff of the City of London on 24 June 2019, assuming office on 27 September 2019. In view of the global disruption to public life brought about by the COVID-19 pandemic, Mainelli was re-elected, on 24 June 2020, to serve a second term as Sheriff of London for 2021.

=== Lord Mayor of the City of London ===
On 29 September 2023, Mainelli was elected Lord Mayor of the City of London, and took office on 10 November 2023, becoming the first American-born person to do so. Mainelli's mayoral theme was 'Connect To Prosper', an initiative that aimed to highlight the City of London's ability to solve global challenges. It championed the "scientific, academic and business worlds", going beyond the traditional support of finance and professional services usually associated with the role.

== Writing ==
Mainelli has published more than 50 journal articles, 250 commercial articles and four books, including the novel Clean Business Cuisine: Now and Z/Yen, written with Ian Harris. Mainelli's economics book, The Price of Fish, also written with Ian Harris, applied his Gresham lecture series ideas to "wicked problems".

=== Publications ===
==== Novels ====
- Michael Mainelli and Ian Harris, Clean Business Cuisine: Now and Z/Yen, Milet Publishing (2000), ISBN 1840592273, 160 pages.

==== Non-fiction ====
- Abdeldjellil Bouzidi and Michael Mainelli, L'Innovation Financière Au Service Du Climat: Les Obligations À Impact Environnemental, Revue Banque (2017), ISBN 978-2-86325-784-5, 123 pages.
- Michael Mainelli and Ian Harris, The Price of Fish: A New Approach to Wicked Economics and Better Decisions, Nicholas Brealey Publishing (2011), ISBN 978-1857885712, 328 pages
- Ian Harris and Michael Mainelli, Information Technology for the Not-for-Profit Sector, ICSA Publishing (2001), ISBN 1860721303, 224 pages.

== Personal life ==
Mainelli married Elisabeth (née Reuß, 1964) in 1996. Together they undertook the restoration of the SB Lady Daphne, a Thames sailing barge built in 1923. Mainelli still supports and lectures on sailing barges and their history, having sold the SB Lady Daphne upon completing renovation in 2017. He is a committee member of the Thames Sailing Barge Match, the second oldest sailing race in the world.

== Awards and honours ==
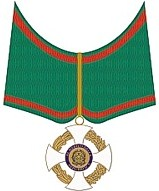
OMRI (Comm.) neck decoration

=== Awards ===
- Department of Trade and Industry SMART Award (2003) for Z/Yen's predictive analytics software
- British Computer Society IT Director of the Year (2004–05)
- Independent Publishers Gold Award for Finance, Investment and Economics (2012) - "The Price of Fish: A New Approach to Wicked Economics and Better Decisions"

=== Honours ===
- Knight of Justice of the Order of St John (KStJ) – 31 January 2024
  - Member of the Order of St John (MStJ) – 21 October 2019
- Commander of the Order of Merit of the Italian Republic (OMRI) – 18 October 2024

== Arms ==
Coat of arms of Michael Mainelli
Notes www.mainelli.org Granted 2019 Crest Upon a Helm with a Wreath Argent and Sable standing upon a Dice Sable manifesting a Two and a Five Argent a Puffin Proper winding Bagpipes with blowstick chanter and two Drones Sable the chanter held by the wing tips the Drones tasseled Vert the Bag Argent charged with a Compass Rose Gules and holding in the dexter foot a Merchant's Purse with drawstrings tasseled Or mantled party Vert and Purpure lined Argent Escutcheon Argent within a Pretzel Knot of five loops Sable interlaced with another Gules the outer part of each loop enclosing a Yin Yang Symbol Sable and Argent the Sable outwards the Roundels Argent charged with a Plus Sign and the Roundels Sable with a Minus Sign all counterchanged an Analemma palewise the small loop upwards Gules interlaced with three Arrows points upwards one in pale and two in saltire Sable Motto Ordo ex χάος (Order from chaos) Orders Behind the Arms, the Badge of St John and suspended below the insignia of a Knight of the Order of St John Other elements Whilst Lord Mayor, Mainelli could impale the City of London arms (dexter) with his personal arms (sinister)

Civic offices
Preceded by Sir Nicholas Lyons	Lord Mayor of London; 2023–2024	Succeeded by Alastair King
