= World Cities Culture Forum =

Network of local governments and cultural sector leaders

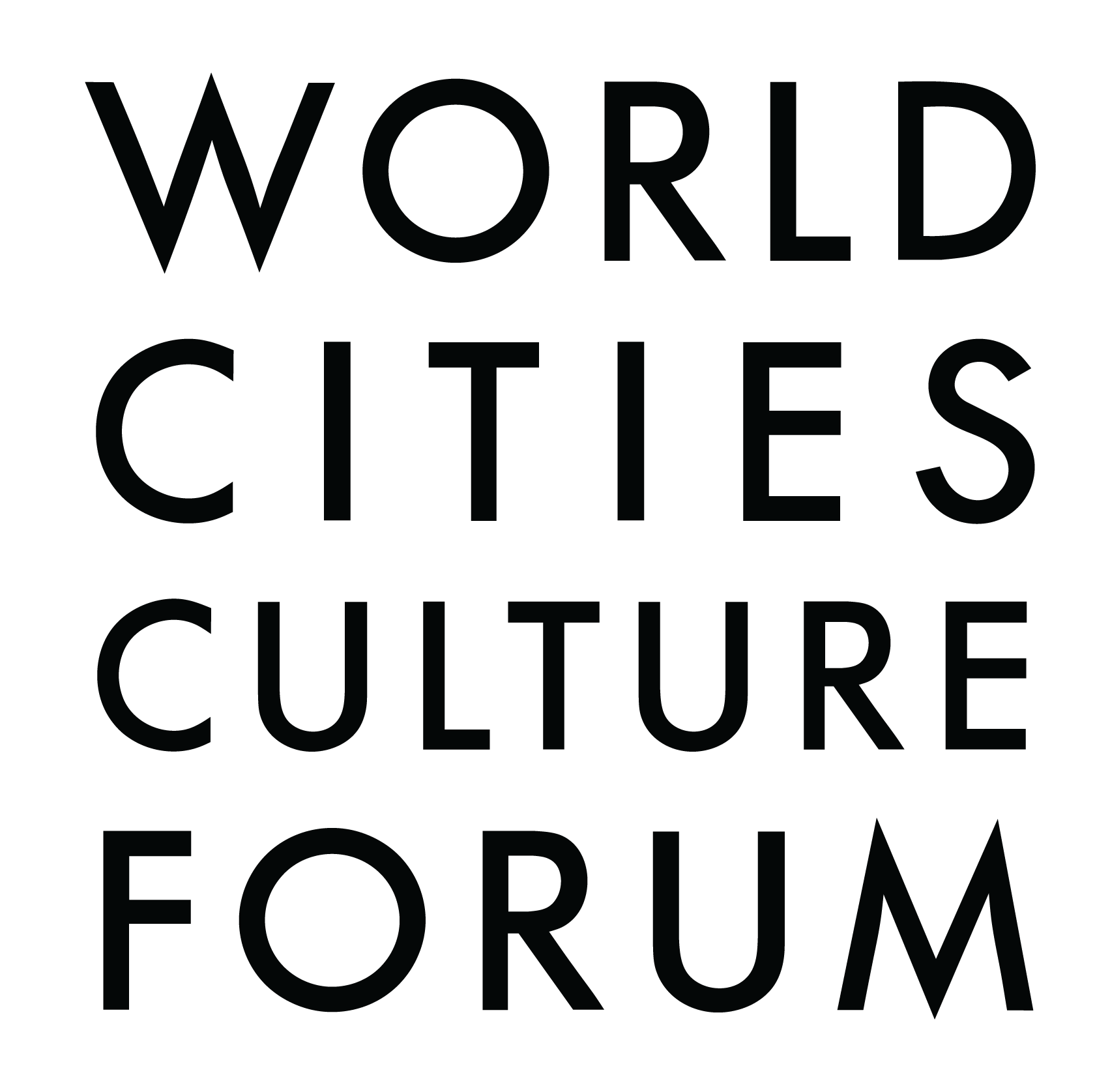
- Founded: August 2012 (London, United Kingdom)
- Type: International organization
- Purpose: Culture
- Region served: Global member cities
- Method: Peer-to-peer exchange, research & communications
- Key people: Mayor Sadiq Khan; Justine Simons, London Deputy Mayor for Culture and Creative Industries (Chair)
- Website: www.worldcitiescultureforum.com

The World Cities Culture Forum is a network of local governments and cultural sector leaders from over 45 world cities.

== History ==
The World Cities Culture Forum was established in London in 2012 with eight cities (London, New York City, Tokyo, Shanghai, Paris, Istanbul, Sydney and Johannesburg) convened by the Mayor of London.

== Member cities ==
The World Cities Culture Forum has over 45 participating member cities across six geographic regions.

- Africa:
  - Nigeria - Lagos
- East Asia:
  - China - Chengdu
  - China - Nanjing
  - China - Guangzhou
  - China - Shenzhen
  - Hong Kong - Hong Kong
  - Japan - Tokyo
  - South Korea - Seoul
  - Taiwan - Taipei
- South Asia:
  - India - Bengaluru
- Europe:
  - Austria - Vienna
  - Belgium - Brussels
  - Finland - Helsinki
  - France - Paris
  - Germany - Cologne
  - Germany - Hamburg
  - Ireland - Dublin
  - Italy - Milan
  - Netherlands - Amsterdam
  - Norway - Oslo
  - Poland - Warsaw
  - Portugal - Lisbon
  - Sweden - Stockholm
  - Switzerland - Zürich
  - Turkey - Istanbul
  - UK - London
  - UK - Edinburgh
  - Ukraine - Kyiv
- Middle East:
  - United Arab Emirates - Abu Dhabi
  - United Arab Emirates - Dubai
- Latin America:
  - Argentina - Buenos Aires
  - Brazil - Brasília
  - Brazil - São Paulo
  - Brazil - Rio de Janeiro
- North America:
  - Canada - Montréal
  - Canada - Toronto
  - Canada - Vancouver
  - United States - Austin
  - United States - Chicago
  - United States - Los Angeles
  - United States - New York City
  - United States - San Francisco
- Southeast Asia & Oceania:
  - Indonesia - Jakarta
  - Australia - Melbourne
  - Australia - Sydney

== Governance ==
The World Cities Culture Forum was founded and is chaired by Justine Simons, Deputy Mayor for Culture and Creative Industries, Greater London Authority.

The World Cities Culture Forum is a registered charity in the UK. The Mayor of London is the Patron.

== World Cities Culture Summit ==
Each year, city partners of the World Cities Culture Forum meet at the three-day World Cities Culture Summit. The Summit is an opportunity for members to share best practice.

The event is by invitation only. Two delegates from each member city – deputy mayors, senior policymakers or advisors in culture – are invited to attend.

Previous Summits have taken place in San Francisco, Seoul, Moscow, London, Shanghai, Amsterdam, Istanbul and Buenos Aires.

The 2019 World Cities Culture Summit took place in Lisbon.

In 2022 the Summit took place in Helsinki, and in São Paulo in 2023.

== Research and publications ==
Underpinning the World Cities Culture Forum’s work is an extensive programme of research and publications.

The World Cities Culture Report is the network’s flagship publication. It is a compendium of data and innovative policies in cities, providing an analysis of comparative data and identifying emerging issues. It is published on a triennial basis. The first version of this report was launched in London during the 2012 Summer Olympics. The latest edition of the World Cities Culture Report was published in October 2022.

The World Cities Culture Forum's research highlights members’ best practice initiatives on specific topics. Publications include the ‘Making Space for Culture Handbook for City Leaders’, a series of case studies to help policymakers better understand the options available to protect and develop cultural spaces, and the ‘Culture and Climate Change Handbook for City Leaders’, a report about the ways in which cities can integrate environmental sustainability into cultural policymaking.

The World Cities Culture Finance Report is the first comparative analysis of culture financing in world cities. It was first published in 2017.

== Online database ==
The World Cities Culture Forum database is a comprehensive database on culture in world cities. It contains over 70 indicators on cultural infrastructure and cultural consumption in member world cities.

== Leadership Exchange ==
A new World Cities Culture Forum Leadership Exchange Programme was created in 2017. The programme supports direct exchanges of learning between member cities through in-depth exchange visits. It is funded by Bloomberg Philanthropies and Google Arts & Culture.
