= SB Lady Daphne =

1923 English sailing barge

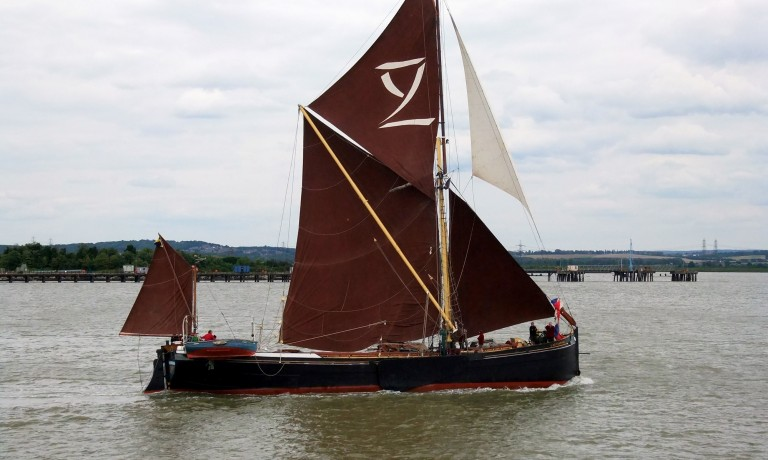
- SB Lady Daphne in full sail in February 2018

History

United Kingdom
- Name: Lady Daphne (1900–25)
- Owner: Sea Laurel Ltd
- Operator: Sea Laurel Ltd
- Ordered: David J Bradley, Rochester
- Builder: Short Bros Ltd, Backfields, Rochester
- Launched: 1923
- Commissioned: 1921
- Identification: IMO number: 5201556; MMSI number: 235054015; Callsign: GUNW; United Kingdom Official Number 127276
- Status: Active

General characteristics
- Class & type: Thames barge
- Tonnage: 86 GRT; Net 116
- Length: 90.75 feet (27.66 m)
- Beam: 21.38 feet (6.52 m)
- Draught: 7.31 feet (2.23 m)
- Propulsion: Sail and diesel engine
- Sail plan: Spritsail

SB Lady Daphne is a wooden Thames sailing barge, built in Rochester, England in 1923. She was used to carry various cargoes such as bricks and Portland stone on the River Thames and along the English Channel. She is infamous for sailing unaided from The Lizard to Tresco in the Scilly Isles, and safety beaching herself in two feet of water on shelving sand.

== History ==
Lady Daphne's original rigging taken from Underhill's measurements.

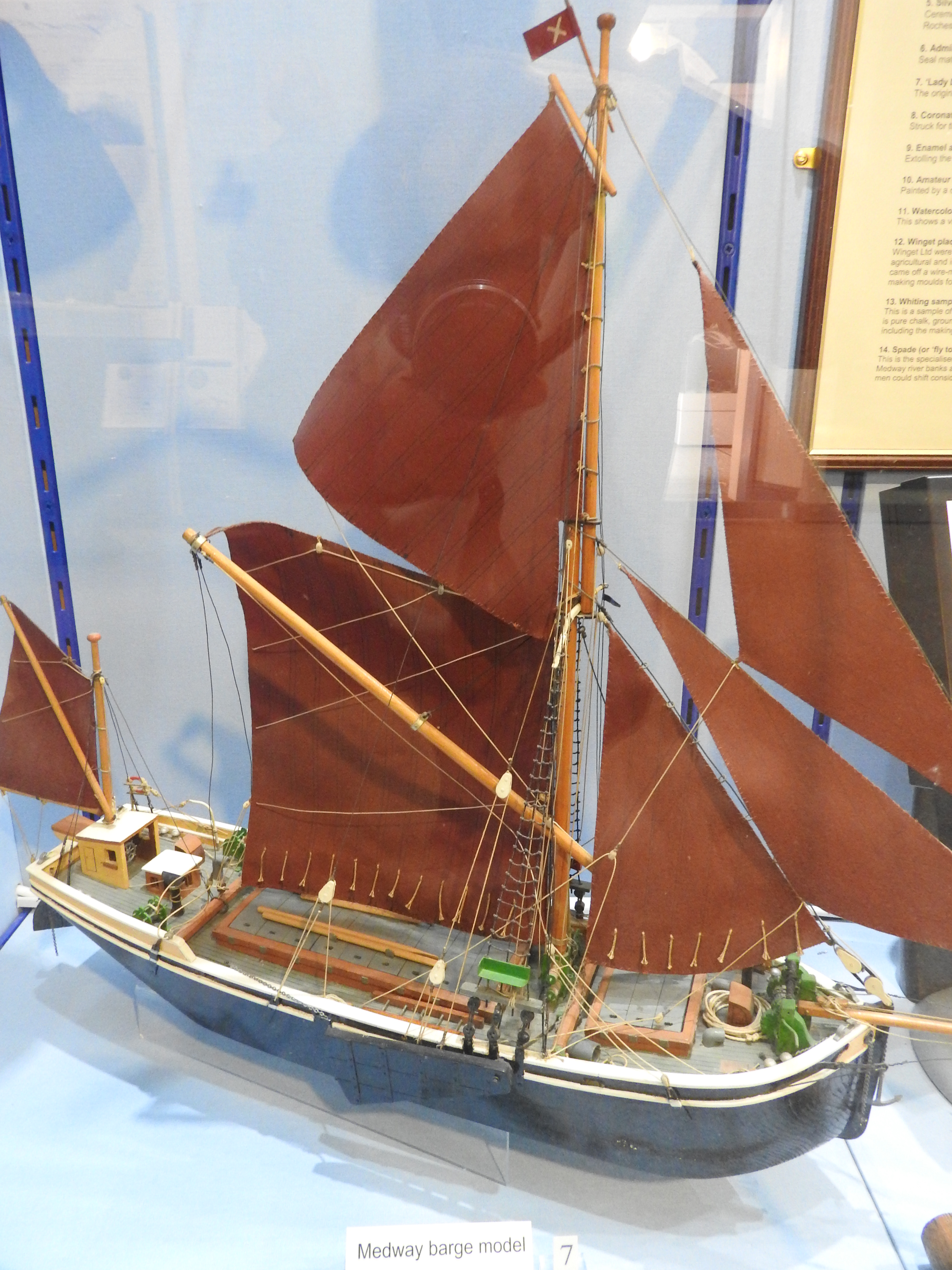
Model in Rochester Guildhall museum

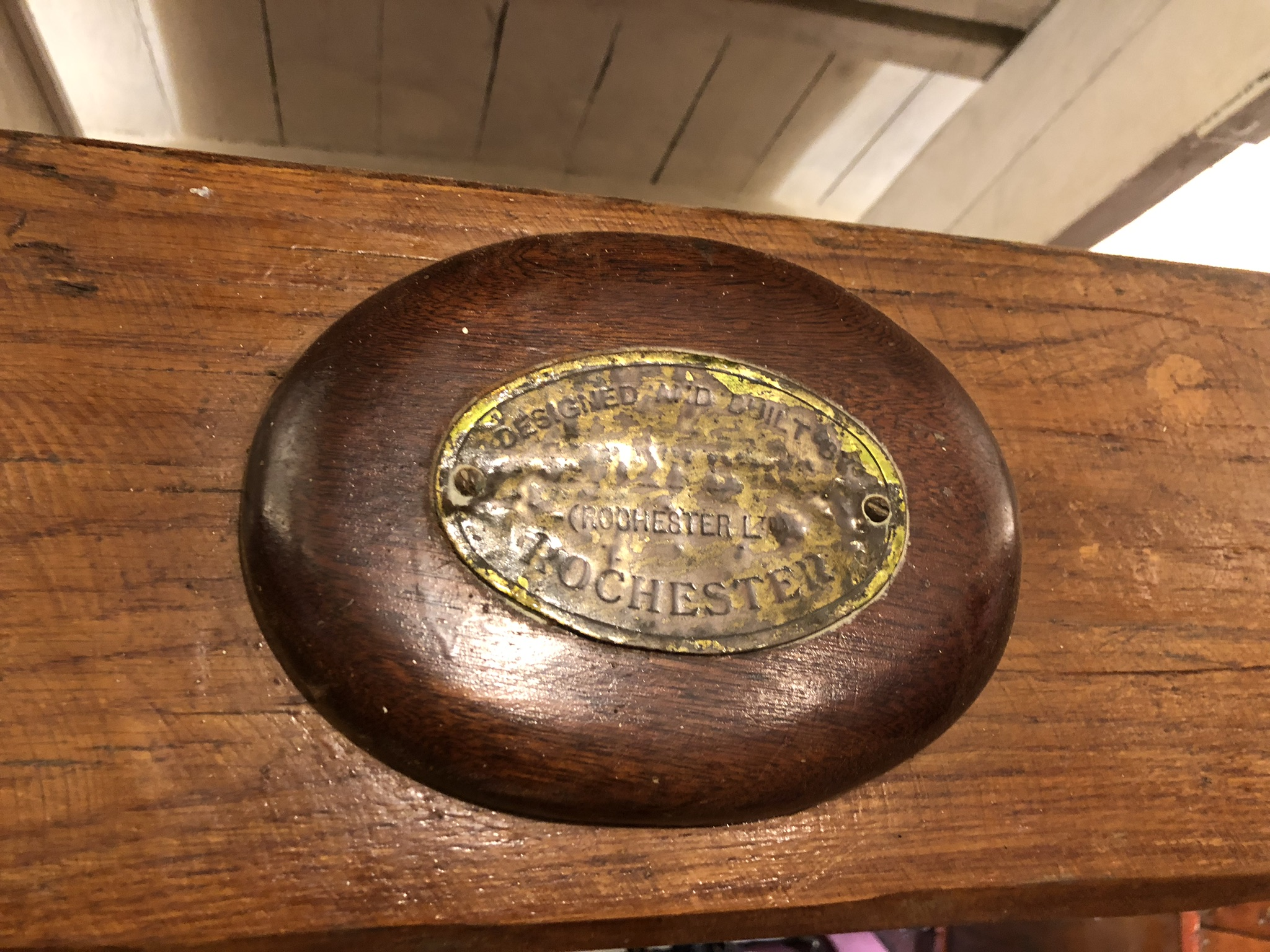
Plaque inside the cabin, commemorating her build. Reads 'Designed and built by Short Bros (Rochester Ltd.) Rochester'

Lady Daphne was commissioned for building in 1921 by David J Bradley of Thomas Watson (Shipping), a prominent barge owning company in Rochester, Kent. She was built by Short Bros. She was one of the last sailing barges to be built from wood, but was built from a plan, (from lines) rather than laying off a half hull model. Lady Daphne was launched in 1923, and Bradley named it after his new-born daughter, Daphne. She had two sister ships, the SB Lady Jean and the SB Lord Haig.

On Boxing Day 1927, Lady Daphne's skipper was washed overboard and the two remaining crew members abandoned her off the Cornish coast. However Lady Daphne, with only the skipper's canary on board, sailed herself through the rocks of the Scilly Isles onto a few tens of yards of safe sand.

On the death of Bradley in 1928, she passed to his widow who transferred her in 1937 to R & W Paul, the maltsters from Ipswich. She had an auxiliary engine installed 1936 and assisted in the salvage of the Herzogin Cecile which was beached off Salcombe.

Lady Daphne remained with R & W Paul, and had her rigging removed becoming a motor-barge. She was sold to Taylor Woodrow in 1973 and re-rigged, then took a berth at St Katharine's Yacht Haven in 1973. She was sold to Elisabeth and Michael Mainelli in 1996. and later sold to Samantha Howe and Andrew Taylor in 2017.

== Related Companies ==
=== Thomas Watson (Shipping) ===
Thomas Watson (Shipping) named their vessels prefaced by "Lady". Thomas Watson (Shipping) ultimately owned 55 sailing barges and 39 coasters along the Medway and Thames. Brothers David J Bradley and Stanley Bradley joined the company as partners. The firm closed in 2000.

=== R & W Paul ===
R & W Paul were maltsters based in Ipswich, Suffolk where in the 1880s, they had 4 maltings and ten barges. Maize and barley were imported from America and eastern Europe, and malt, barley and smaller quantities of wheat and oats were shipped outwards. Using the tides, Thames sailing barges could reliably do the Ipswich-London run in 12 hours and 14 hours to return. Of the 16 barges that sailed to the beaches of Dunkirk in 1940, 6 were owned by R & W Paul.

== Media ==
She has appeared in BBC's ‘Britain Afloat’ television show which was broadcast in September 2017. She has appeared in BBC's 'Heir Hunters' television show, Series 9, Episode 5 (of 20), “Morris/Evans” which was broadcast on 27 February 2015.

== See also ==
- SB Kathleen
