= Confidence accounting =

Accounting method

Confidence accounting is a method of accounting whereby some of the figures are expressed not as single point estimates, but rather as probability distributions. Under Confidence Accounting, the end results of audits would be presentations of distributions for major entries in the profit & loss, balance sheet and cashflow statements. The proposed benefits of Confidence Accounting include a fairer representation of financial results, reduced footnotes, more measurable audit quality and a mitigation of mark-to-market perturbations.

== History ==
This method is in the discussion stage and has not yet been adopted by any accountancy body, though events and publications have been sponsored by the Association of Chartered Certified Accountants and some other events by the Institute of Chartered Accountants of Scotland.

The term "confidence accounting" was first adopted in the mid-2000s by the Long Finance initiative, having grown out of earlier publications that referred to "stochastic accounting".

== Advantages ==
Confidence accounting has the alleged advantages of:

- Being more scientific. Most scientific experimental results are expressed as expected values and some quantisation of the error involved, accounts are not.
- Giving a fairer view of the risk associated with the accounts. For example a company may own drilling rights to a potential oilfield. The value of this asset could be zero, or could be immense. If this is not known then a distribution would be a more faithful representation of the asset value, rather than a single estimate of the mean value.
- Holding the accountants responsible Accounts from previous years can be retrospectively checked against the forecasts, to see if, for example an accountancy firm actually got 90% of its accounts within the 90% error band forecast.

== Criticism ==
Confidence accounting can be criticized for:

- adding further complexity to an already complex subject, although its supporters claim that this method could actually reduce the size of accounts.
- the alleged advantages of holding the accountants responsible can be evaded by accountants claiming (with some justification) that the forecast distributions do not take into account unforeseen macroeconomic factors.
- no external party having both the power and the interest to make this happen.
