= China Development Institute =

Chinese think tank

- Simplified Chinese: 中国（深圳）综合开发研究院
- Traditional Chinese: 中國（深圳）綜合開發研究院
Transcriptions
Standard Mandarin
- Hanyu Pinyin: Zhōngguó (Shēnzhèn) Zōnghé Kāifā Yánjiūyuàn

China Development Institute (CDI) is a China-based think tank headquartered in Shenzhen, Guangdong, bordering Hong Kong. It was founded in 1989 to support the reform and opening up. CDI is also tasked with expanding international academic exchanges and cooperation between think tanks and private enterprise.

CDI has approximately 100 full-time staff and with a network of affiliated scholars and experts from the region. They research leading issues concerning Chinese economic reforms and opening up. CDI also undertakes corporate consulting for domestic and foreign companies.

The institute's research activities and consulting services focus on market economic activities and reform to promote new frameworks to replace traditional ones. Shenzhen has historically been the city where China does pilot testing of new economic reforms since Deng Xiaoping designated it a Special Economic Zone.

In December 2015, CDI was accredited as one of top 25 national high level think tanks in a pilot project of the Chinese central government which is aimed at promoting the building of new type think tanks with Chinese characteristics. Ranked 169th in the world, it is among the best in China's new think tanks.

Xiang Huaicheng, former Minister, Ministry of Finance, is the chairman and Fan Gang is the President.

== Global Financial Centres Index ==
In September 2015 CDI started a collaborative relationship with Z/Yen Group in London, UK and jointly launched the biannual Global Financial Centres Index (GFCI), a research publication which evaluates and ranks the competitiveness of the major financial centres around the world.
