= The London Accord =

The London Accord is a collaboration between investment banks, research houses, academics and NGOs to produce free research on climate change for financial investors.

It is intended as a reference guide for investors in the climate change sector.

The London Accord is the largest cooperative project in the world on investment opportunities in avoiding climate change (about 7 million UK pounds).

== History ==
The London Accord began in 2005, was launched formally in March 2007 and published its first results on 19 December 2007 launching them at a roll out meeting at Mansion House in London. These findings are freely available from its website.

Its main summary of December 2007 said:

- The IPCC shows that the world needs to act to avoid disastrous climate change, and act now.
- The Stern Report shows that the overall cost of strong early action is much less than the cost of inaction.
- The International Energy Agency shows the changes in fuel mix and energy usage that are necessary to stabilise greenhouse gas concentrations at a safe level.
- The UN Framework Convention on Climate Change shows how much money is required by region and by technology to realise a scenario that achieves stabilisation.
- The UNFCCC report shows further that 86% of that investment has to come from the private sector. That equates to private sector investment through 2030 in excess of $600bn per year.
- The London Accord report shows investors and policy makers by technology how attractive that private investment is, at the end of 2007.

== Findings ==
The findings of the research carried out show that:

- energy investment is going to become much, much riskier
- key governmental focus should be on establishing cap-and-trade markets, then international carbon standards, then regulation; not taxation
- forestry is a big unknown – governments should fund research into the real extent of abatement potential and the real costs of forestation
- carbon capture and sequestration/storage (CCS) seems an unrealistic investment

Since 2007 the London Accord has become one of the leading sources for policy-makers of investment research on environmental, social and governance issues. By the end of 2011, over 250 research reports had been released to the public. Funding for the London Accord has come from the City of London Corporation, Z/Yen Group and Gresham College.

== Quotes about the London Accord ==
David Lewis (Lord Mayor) said:

Climate change represents an unparalleled threat to our life on the planet and through the London Accord, the City's best brains have cooperated in an unprecedented way to tackle the challenge.

The London Accord is the first open-source, co-operative investment analysis into opportunities and challenges in the energy supply and climate change market - which needs to be $600bn a year invested from the private sector over the next 25 years.

Climate change can be tackled if the investment is there - and the London Accord is the first comprehensive map for the investment community.

== See also ==
- The Carbon Principles
