= Financial Development Index =

Economic indicator

The World Economic Forum publishes a Financial Development Index annually, which measures and analyses the factors enabling the development of financial systems among different economies. It provides a comprehensive means for economies to benchmark various aspects of their financial systems.

First published in 2008, the Financial Development Index was developed by the World Economic Forum in collaboration with the academics, international organizations and business leaders.

== Financial Development Index 2010 ==
The following is a ranking of the top ten:

1. Hong Kong
2. United States
3. United Kingdom
4. Singapore
5. Australia
6. Canada
7. Japan
8. Switzerland
9. South Korea
10. Netherlands
