= Global Financial Centres Index =

Ranking of the competitiveness of financial centres

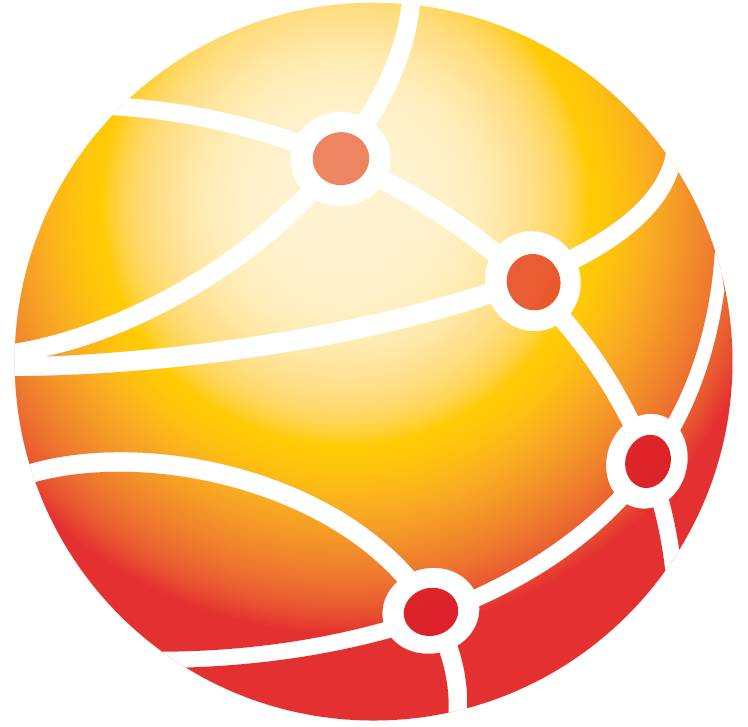
Logo

The Global Financial Centres Index (GFCI) ranks the competitiveness of financial centres based on over 29,000 assessments from an online questionnaire and over 100 indices from organisations such as the World Bank, the Organisation for Economic Co-operation and Development (OECD), and the Economist Intelligence Unit. It was first published in March 2007. It has been jointly published twice per year by the London-based think tank Z/Yen and the China Development Institute since 2015. It is widely quoted as a top source for ranking financial centres.

== GFCI 40 (September 2026) ==
The edition rated 117 financial centres using 39,531 assessments from 6,147 financial-services professionals. New York remained first, while Zurich entered the top 10 in place of San Francisco.

Top 20 centres in GFCI 40
Centre	Rating	Change in rank
(United States) New York City	761	Steady
(United Kingdom) London	757	Steady
Hong Kong	756	Steady
Singapore	755	Steady
(China) Shanghai	754	▲1
(Japan) Tokyo	753	▲4
(South Korea) Seoul	752	▲1
(China) Shenzhen	751	▲1
(United Arab Emirates) Dubai	750	▼2
(Switzerland) Zurich	749	▲1
(United States) San Francisco	748	▼6
(Switzerland) Geneva	747	▲6
(United Arab Emirates) Abu Dhabi	746	▲8
(United States) Los Angeles	745	▼2
(United States) Chicago	744	▼1
(China) Beijing	743	▲6
Luxembourg	742	▼1
(United States) Boston	741	▼5
(United States) Washington, D.C.	740	▼2
(Japan) Osaka	739	▲6

== Financial centre profiles GFCI 36, September 2024) ==
The report ranks international financial centres into the following matrix:

Financial Centre Profiles (GFCI 36, September 2024)
Level	Broad and deep Global leaders	Relatively broad Global diversified	Relatively deep Global specialists	Emerging Global contenders
Global	(United Kingdom) London (United Arab Emirates) Dubai (United States) New York; Singapore (South Korea) Seoul (France) Paris (United States) Los Angeles (Japan) Tokyo (United Arab Emirates) Abu Dhabi (Switzerland) Zurich (Germany) Frankfurt	(Netherlands) Amsterdam (Malaysia) Kuala Lumpur (Belgium) Brussels	(China) Shanghai (Saudi Arabia) Riyadh (Morocco) Casablanca (China) Beijing; Hong Kong; Luxembourg	(Kazakhstan) Astana (Rwanda) Kigali
Level	Broad and deep Established international	Relatively broad International diversified	Relatively deep International specialists	Emerging International contenders
International	(United States) Boston (United States) Chicago (South Korea) Busan (United Kingdom) Edinburgh (Italy) Rome (Switzerland) Geneva (Canada) Montreal (Canada) Toronto (Sweden) Stockholm (Germany) Munich (United States) San Francisco (Australia) Sydney (Japan) Osaka (United States) Washington D.C. (Australia) Melbourne (United States) Miami (Canada) Vancouver	(Thailand) Bangkok (Austria) Vienna (Spain) Madrid (Italy) Milan (Germany) Berlin (Greece) Athens (Denmark) Copenhagen	(India) Mumbai (India) GIFT City; Bermuda (China) Qingdao (China) Shenzhen (Israel) Tel Aviv; Jersey	(Russia) Moscow; Mexico City; Panama (The Bahamas) Bahamas (Kenya) Nairobi; Bahrain (Indonesia) Jakarta (Qatar) Doha (Nigeria) Lagos (India) New Delhi (South Africa) Johannesburg (South Africa) Cape Town (China) Guangzhou (Brazil) São Paulo (Rwanda) Kigali; British Virgin Islands; Cayman Islands (Taiwan) Taipei; Liechtenstein
Level	Broad and deep Established players	Relatively broad Local diversified	Relatively deep Local specialists	Emerging Evolving centres
Local	(Norway) Oslo (United States) San Diego (United Kingdom) Glasgow (Canada) Calgary (United States) Minneapolis/St Paul (New Zealand) Wellington	(Chile) Santiago (Portugal) Lisbon (Poland) Warsaw (Czech Republic) Prague (United States) Atlanta (Finland) Helsinki	(Brazil) Rio de Janeiro (Estonia) Tallinn; Malta (Vietnam) Ho Chi Minh City (China) Chengdu (Switzerland) Lugano (China) Xi'an (China) Hangzhou (China) Wuhan (China) Tianjin (Iceland) Reykjavík; Monaco (China) Nanjing; Gibraltar (China) Dalian	(Azerbaijan) Baku (Philippines) Manila (Argentina) Buenos Aires (Bulgaria) Sofia (Latvia) Riga; Cyprus (Russia) Saint Petersburg (Hungary) Budapest (Iran) Tehran (Colombia) Bogotá; Guernsey (Slovakia) Bratislava (Lithuania) Vilnius (Kazakhstan) Almaty; Trinidad and Tobago; Barbados; Isle of Man; Kuwait City
