= Z/Yen =

British commercial consultancy and venture firm

Coordinates: 51°30′45.2″N 0°5′18.3″W

Z/Yen Group
- Logo used since 1994

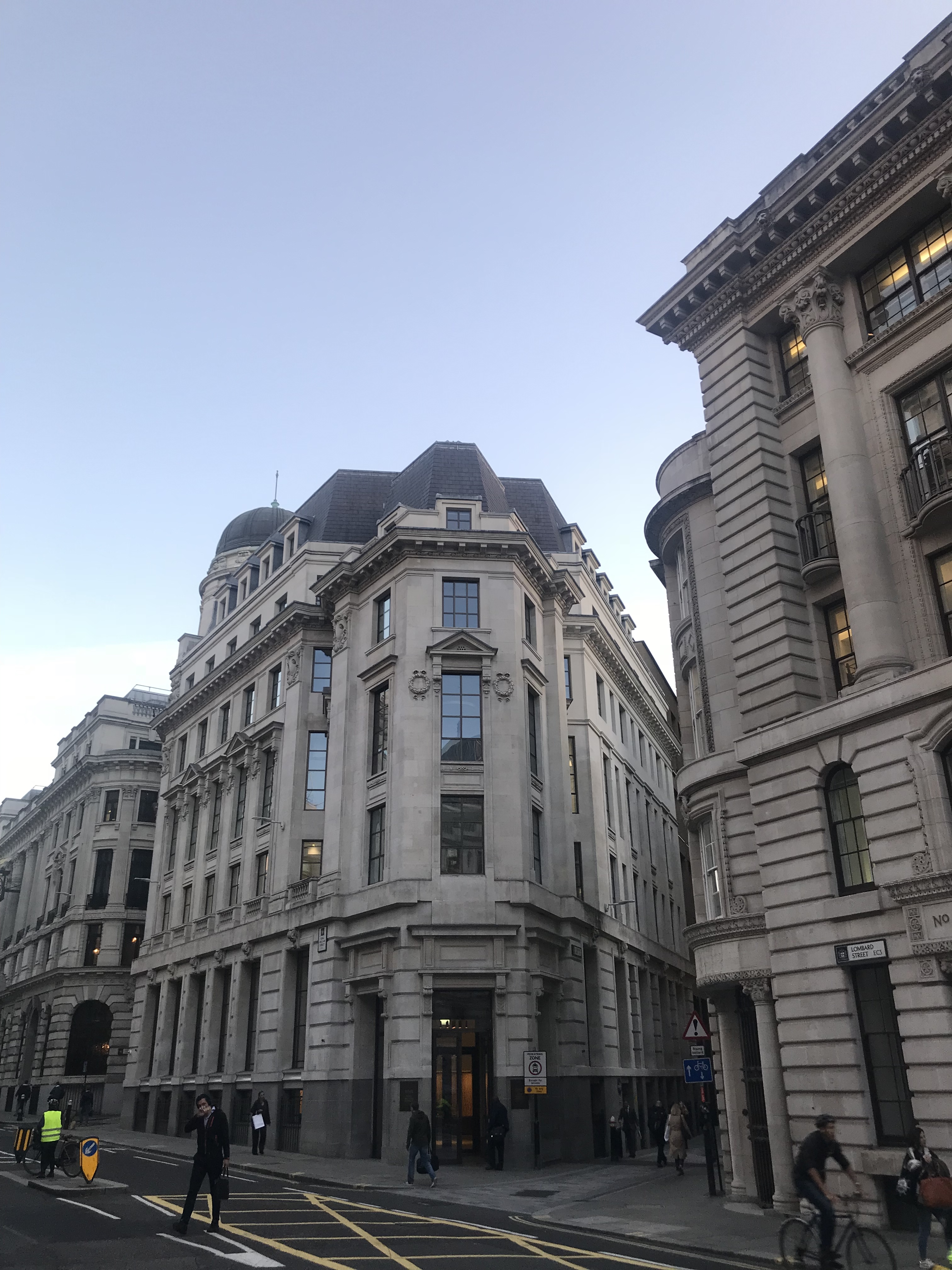
- Headquarters, 1 King William Street
- Industry: Management consulting, think tank
- Founded: 1994; 32 years ago
- Headquarters: 1 King William Street, City of London
- Key people: Michael Mainelli (Chairman); Ian Harris (Managing Director); Mike Wardle (CEO)
- Website: www.zyen.com

Z/Yen is a commercial think tank, consultancy and venture firm headquartered in the City of London. It works in the financial services, technology and voluntary sectors on research, performance review and strategic management. Founded in 1994, Z/Yen has developed the London Accord, the Global Financial Centres Index, the Global Intellectual Property Index for Taylor Wessing and Taskforce 2000 (the UK industry response to the Millennium Bug).

Z/Yen conducts market research and intelligence. It publishes most of its research freely on its own website. Z/Yen is split into 2 parts; Long Finance for Pro bono work and The Financial Services Club (FSC) which provides networking dinners and events for city professionals.

== History ==
During its early years, Z/Yen worked with companies such as British Gas, the London Stock Exchange, Defense Evaluation and Research Agency (DERA), now DSTL and QinetiQ, and Bloomberg. Z/Yen was a key player in the founding of Taskforce 2000, a private sector initiative designed to alert people to the Millennium Bug.

In 1996, Z/Yen launched the £1.9M Financial Laboratory in collaboration with BZW, Royal and Sun Alliance, The London Stock Exchange, DERA, City University, City University Business School, The Worshipful Company of Information Technologists, and Silicon Graphics. The project won a £750,000 DTI Foresight Challenge award later that year.

In the late 1990s, Z/Yen expanded its services to include not-for-profit sector work. The company worked with organizations such as Cancer Research Campaign, BEN, and The Children's Society. It also undertook a major pan-European study into the market for OTC derivatives outsourcing.

A version of the company's bourse game was played at St James' Palace as a part of a Marine Stewardship Council event in 2001. In January 2003, Z/Yen launched PropheZy, a predictive Dynamic, Anomaly & Pattern Response (DAPR) system, which received a £45,000 Smart Award from the Department of Trade and Industry. A year later, VizZy, a complementary visualization system for PropheZy, was launched. In 2005, Z/Yen was appointed by the Institute of Fundraising, with partner Business in the Community, to run the enquiry line and information center for the Payroll Giving Centre program funded by the Home Office.

In 2007, Z/Yen created its Global Financial Centres Index for the City of London Corporation, sold its investment banking cost-per-trade benchmarking unit to Aon, and launched the London Accord, which provides an open-source research resource on finance and environmental, social and governance (ESG) issues. In 2008, Z/Yen launched the Global Intellectual Property Index for the legal firm Taylor Wessing. Z/Yen also founded the ExtZy game, which creates a stock market from the internet through the Long Finance initiative. Z/Yen's research has included carbon bonds, non-monetary trade, and Confidence Accounting.

Michael Mainelli and Ian Harris, co-founders of Z/Yen, launched their third book, The Price of Fish, published by Nicholas Brealey Publishing. The book was awarded the Gold Medal in the Finance, Investment, and Economics category of the 2012 Independent Publisher Book Awards. In 2018, Z/Yen was also awarded the Diamond Quality Mark in recognition of the staff's continued contribution to charity through payroll giving.

In 2014, Z/Yen published "City Walks: Finance At Your Feet" on iBooks. In 2015, the InterChainZ project developed several implementations of mutual distributed ledgers and launched Distributed Futures, a forum dedicated to technology and disruption.

In 2017, Z/Yen published Financial Centre Futures - The Global Financial Centres Index 21 and The Global Financial Centres Index 22, which rank the competitiveness of financial centres globally based on multiple factors including business environment, infrastructure, human capital, and reputation. The reports also include special reports on topics such as fintech, green finance, and Islamic finance.

In 2018, Z/Yen launched the Global Green Finance Index (GGFI) in Brussels, which ranks financial centres around the world based on the quality and depth of their green finance offerings. The GGFI is a collaborative effort with the think tank Finance Watch.

More recently, Z/Yen has been involved in the development of blockchain technology and cryptocurrencies through its Long Finance initiative. The Eternal Coin's "Economic Simulation And Control Of Cryptocurrencies" project aims to develop a technical framework for a cryptocurrency simulator. In addition, Z/Yen published Financial Centre Futures - The Global Financial Centres Index 23 and The Global Financial Centres Index 24 in March and September 2019, respectively, and the China Financial Centres Index 10.

=== Regular indices ===
- Global Financial Centres Index
- Global Intellectual Property Index
- Global Green Finance Index

== Publications ==
- Clean Business Cuisine: Now and Z/Yen - (2000)
- Information Technology for the Not-for-profit Sector - ICSA Publishing (2001)
- Expertise: Search and Deploy - (2003)
- The Road To Long Finance: A Systems View Of The Credit Scrunch - (2009) (with Bob Giffords)
- The Price of Fish - Nicholas Brealey Publishing (2011)
