= DAT/EM Systems International =

American software company

- Type: Private
- Founded: 1985; 41 years ago
- Headquarters: Anchorage, Alaska
- Website: datem.com

DAT/EM Systems International is an Alaska-based company that develops digital photogrammetric mapping applications to extract and edit 3D vector terrain and object features from stereo imagery and point clouds. DAT/EM Systems International develops solutions for the photogrammetry, engineering & GIS industries.

== DAT/EM History ==
In mid-1985, three Pacific Northwest photogrammetric firms combined resources to create DAT/EM Systems International based in Anchorage, Alaska. By the spring of 1987, DAT/EM Systems International had produced its first viable digital mapping product. The first product allowed AutoCAD software to accept 3D coordinate data input from an analog stereoplotter. A similar interface to MicroStation CAD software followed, as well as support for analytical stereoplotters.

DAT/EM Systems immediately moved its stereoplotter interface and support services into the global marketplace and became a leader in the global digital photogrammetry industry. At the 1999 ASPRS Conference in Portland, Oregon, DAT/EM released its first all-digital stereoplotter, the Summit PC digital softcopy stereo workstation. Using the knowledge acquired from designing Summit PC, DAT/EM Systems moved forward to create its well-known 3D digital stereoplotter, Summit Evolution.

In addition to working with the evolved forms of the AutoCAD and MicroStation interfaces, Summit Evolution is capable of 3D digitizing and editing with ESRI's ArcGIS and Blue Marble Global Mapper products. This capability opened DAT/EM software products to the GIS marketplace. Because DAT/EM Systems offered client solutions for both their photogrammetric and GIS needs, this increased the number of users for the Summit Evolution softcopy system worldwide.

Since 1985, DAT/EM had grown from a small Alaskan company to an international network of resellers including two independent sales and support branches: DAT/EM Systems Europe and DAT/EM Systems Indonesia. DAT/EM headquarters is still in Anchorage, Alaska.

== Public Recognition and Community Involvement ==
In 1993, DAT/EM Systems International was awarded the Alaska International Exporter of the Year Award, now called the Alaska Governor's North Star Awards for International Excellence. The award is given to companies in the state of Alaska who have a large volume of worldwide distribution of goods. In 2014, DAT/EM Systems International won the award again for its contribution to Alaska and worldwide distribution of goods and services. In 2004, DAT/EM donated three Summit Evolution mapping systems to the University of Alaska Anchorage Geomatics Department in the School of Engineering to provide local students access to the best equipment and latest technologies. To recognize the donation, Chancellor Elaine Maimon held a celebration on Friday, April 22, 2005. The celebration was held in conjunction with the new BS Degree in Engineering Program at UAA.

DAT/EM products and company overviews are found in several world publications. In 2014 alone, DAT/EM products and company articles have appeared in GeoSpatial World, GeoInformatics, xyHt Magazine and more.

== Current and Future ==
DAT/EM Systems, with over 500 clients in more than 70 countries, continues to develop and implement software in the digital mapping and GIS industries.

== DAT/EM Products and Support ==
DAT/EM products include a complete set of photogrammetric mapping tools including software and hardware options. DAT/EM is also part of the Dell PartnerDirect program and through it offers compatible computer products configured to work best with DAT/EM software and hardware. DAT/EM offers technical support with the purchase of DAT/EM Software. Support includes access to software upgrades, technical assistance and the support forum.

=== DAT/EM Software ===
==== Summit Evolution ====
Summit Evolution provides a set of tools for extracting 3D information from stereo imagery. There are four levels of Summit Evolution: Professional, Feature Collection, Lite, Mobile.

==== Summit UAS ====
Summit UAS offers tools to analyze UAS data by viewing, drawing, editing and defining 3D features.

==== LandScape ====
LandScape edits large terrain point clouds, including LiDAR, and offers tools for classifying and viewing stereo, modifying points, and generating new data based on points.

==== Capture ====
Capture acts as an interface between Summit Evolution and either AutoCAD, MicroStation, ArcGIS or Global Mapper.

==== MapEditor ====
MapEditor enhances productivity for vector editing and automatic batch processing in AutoCAD or MicroStation.

==== Ortho+Mosaic ====
Ortho+Mosaic is the orthoimagery module for Summit Evolution. Tools include seamline editor, color adjustment and balancing, and Summit project manager.

==== Airfield3D ====
Airfield3D is a standards-compliant mapping tool for detecting airspace obstructions with ArcGIS.

==== Contour Creator ====
Contour Creator builds cartographic-quality TINs and contours. Summit Evolution’s Terrain Visualizer adds real-time feedback during terrain model editing.

=== DAT/EM Hardware ===
The DAT/EM Keypad is touch pad used either as an accessory to DAT/EM softcopy products or as a productivity enhancer for third-party products.

The ‘TouchScreen’ from DAT/EM is an LCD monitor with an integrated tactile interface. The TouchScreen allows operators to quickly change command sequences during map compilation.

The DAT/EM KeyPad Advantage™ is a KeyPad app for Android devices and part of the DAT/EM Keypad product line. It uses any tablet device running the Android operating system and a Bluetooth adapter for wireless communication to a desktop or laptop computer.

HandWheels offer X, Y, Z coordinate entry. They can be adjusted on three axes. The operator can set the height, depth, and angle of the handwheels.

== Competitors ==
- Hexagon – Intergraph: Hexagon Geospatial provides photogrammetric tools for triangulation, real stereo visualization, terrain generation and editing, orthomosaic creation and 3D feature extraction.
- BAE Systems: SOCET SET® by BAE Systems is digital mapping software used for precision photogrammetry and geospatial analysis.

== Applications ==
- Digital Mapping
- Civil Engineering
- Cartography
- Conservation (ethic)
- Forestry
- Mining
- Archaeology
- Environmental Science

== See also ==
- Photogrammetry
- Geomatics
- 3D Stereo
- Stereoscopy
- Stereographic Projection
- Orthophoto
- Remote Sensing
- Imaging Spectroscopy
- Aerial Survey
- Photomapping
- Geospatial Analysis
- Geographic information system
- International Society of Photogrammetric and Remote Sensing (ISPRS)

== Related Terms ==
- Image Processing
- Topography
- Multispectral Image
- AutoCAD
- MicroStation
- ArcGIS
- Global Mapper
- Surveying
- SuperMap
