= Rubbersheeting =

In cartography and geographic information systems, rubbersheeting is a form of coordinate transformation that warps a vector dataset to match a known geographic space. This is most commonly needed when a dataset has systematic positional error, such as one digitized from a historical map of low accuracy. The mathematics and procedure are very similar to the georeferencing of raster images, and this term is occasionally used for that process as well, but image georegistration is an unambiguous term for the raster process.

== Applications in history and historical geography ==
Rubbersheeting is a useful technique in HGIS, where it is used to digitize and add old maps as feature layers in a modern GIS. Before aerial photography arrived, most maps were highly inaccurate by modern standards. Rubbersheeting may improve the value of such sources and make them easier to compare to modern maps.

== Software ==
- ESRI's ArcGIS 8.3+ has the capability of rubbersheeting vector data, and ArcMap 9.2+ may also rubber-sheet raster layers.
- Autodesk's AutoCAD Map 3D and AutoCAD Civil 3D (which includes most of AutoCAD Map 3D's functionality) allows a user to rubbersheet vector data, and Autodesk's Raster Design (an add-in product for AutoCAD-based products) allows a user to rubbersheet raster data.
- Blue Marble Geographics' Global Mapper allows a user to rubbersheet raster data.
- Cadcorp Spatial Information System software (SIS Map Modeller) is offering a tool for rubbersheeting data layers.
- QGIS Georeferencer plug-in provides a number of transformation types including Thin Plate Spline, which enables full rubber-sheeting. QGIS is a free open-source GIS package.
- Allmaps is a free and open source program that support in-browser rubber-sheeting of IIIF images using WebGL technology.

== See also ==
- Image rectification
- Image registration
