= VPF =

VPF can refer to:

- Vascular permeability factor, an alternate name for the protein vascular endothelial growth factor (VEGF)
- Vector Product Format
- Vietnam Football Federation (Vietnam Professional Football Jointstock Company)
- Virtual Print Fee
