= DLG =

DLG may refer to:

- Dansk Landbrugs Grovvareselskab, a Danish feed company
- Dark Latin Groove, a band created in New York in the late 1990s
- Darling railway station, Melbourne
- David Lloyd George, a British politician who was prime minister in World War I
- De la Gardiegymnasiet, Upper secondary school in Lidköping, Sweden
- Digital Line Graph, a cartographic file format used by the United States Geological Survey
- Dillingham Airport - DLG is the 3 letter IATA code for the airport
- Direct Line Group, a British insurance company
- Discus Launch Glider, a type and discipline of radio controlled glider
- DLG was the US Navy Hull Classification symbol for Guided Missile Destroyer Leaders
- Dolgan language (ISO 639-3 code)

Other:

- Deutsche Landwirtschafts-Gesellschaft, the German Agricultural Society
