= Popping (computer graphics) =

Undesirable visual effect in 3D computer graphics

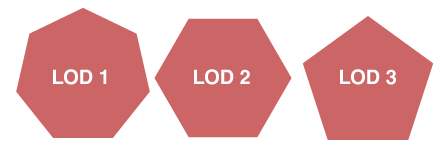
This is an exaggerated example of a 3D object's geometrically being reduced using a level of detail technique. LOD0 is the highest detail version of the object and each subsequent LOD reduces the quality of the object. A change without intermediate steps from LOD1 to LOD2 will be obvious to the viewer.

In 3D computer graphics, popping refers to an undesirable visual effect that occurs when the transition of a 3D object to a different pre-calculated level of detail (LOD) is abrupt and obvious to the viewer. The LOD-ing algorithm reduces the geometrical complexity of a 3D object the further it is from the viewer and returns that lost complexity as the viewer gets closer to the 3D object, causing it to pop as it becomes suddenly more detailed. The LOD-ing algorithms can depend on more factors than just distance from the viewer, but it is often the primary factor that is considered. Popping is most obvious when switching between different LODs directly without intermediate steps. Techniques like geomorphing and LOD blending can reduce visual popping significantly by making the transitions more gradual.

== LOD Blending ==
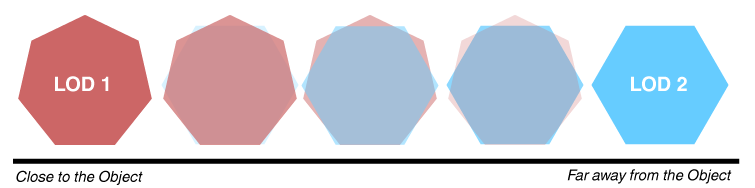
An exaggerated example of LOD blending to illustrate how apparent the ghosting effect can be

Also known as alpha blending, or alpha compositing this technique reduces popping by displaying both LODs of a 3D model simultaneously and blending them together over a small transition period.

During the blending process an alpha value is specified for each LOD, which determines transparency of objects. At the beginning of the transition, the initial LOD would have an alpha value of 1.0 (fully opaque) and the new LOD would have an alpha value of 0.0 (fully transparent). As the viewer approaches the 3D object and reaches the distance when the LOD change would normally occur, the LOD alpha values would gradually switch until the new LOD has an alpha value of 1.0, at which point the initial LOD would no longer be rendered.

It is important to stress that LOD blending only occurs at the distance that a LOD would normally change and only over a small distance. So if during a simulation the LOD change would occur at the 100 units of distance then the LOD blending process would begin at the 95 units of distance and be complete by 105 units of distance.

LOD blending has two major disadvantages. It is expensive in terms of computing power since both LODs are rendered simultaneously for the blend to occur and can be counterproductive since the reason to use LOD-ing algorithms is to reduce the expense of rendering scenes. The technique is not effective when the viewer is close to the 3D object since the blending process will be obviously apparent and result in a visible ghosting effect.

== Geomorphing ==
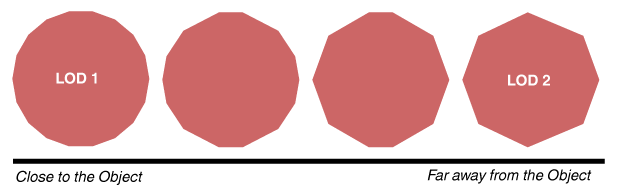
Geomorphing creates a smoother transition between LOD0 and LOD1 by creating approximated meshes to act as intermediate steps.

Geomorphing is a technique that reduces popping during LOD changes by adding approximations of the 3D model to serve as intermediate steps between two LODs to create a smooth transition. Edge collapses (removing vertices) and vertex splits (adding vertices) are the primary operations to modify the 3D model using this method.

Traditional geomorphing creates a sequence of 3D models between two LODs. The sequence cannot be interrupted once it has begun and no modifications can be done to it until the LOD change is complete. Due to this restriction, traditional geomorphing is not suited to interactive simulations because the process cannot be quickly reversed if conditions change unexpectedly.

Real-time geomorphing directly modifies individual vertices of the 3D model to adjust its LOD. This allows changes made to the geomorph during any frame, either to halt ongoing morphs or initiate further morphs of the 3D model. Since multiple vertices can be triggered to morph independently one of another, certain vertices need to be temporarily locked to ensure a smooth transition occurs, which could result in a delayed LOD change. The flexibility of real-time geomorphing makes it an effective solution for interactive simulations.

== See also ==
- Progressive meshes
