= Vizerra =

3D models viewing software

- Developer: 3DreamTeam Company
- Operating system: Windows XP, Windows Vista, Windows 7
- Website: vizerra.com

Vizerra is a software platform for viewing 3D models which provides its user with integrated additional content, such as video guides. Currently available 3D models are used for demonstration, advertising and educational purposes.

== Project Overview ==
The project title has its origins in Latin and combines three words: visio (”vision, image”), erro (”roam”) and terra (“earth”). It was chosen because Vizerra project began as a platform for virtual travel.

At the moment Vizerra is primarily a library of virtual 3D copies of real sites. These include monasteries, temples, squares and monuments of ancient cultures, such as Machu Picchu, Prague’s Old Town Square, Angkor Wat and others.

== Client Application ==
The first version of Vizerra client application user interface was made by Art. Lebedev Studio.

Vizerra uses the following technologies:

Umbra by Umbra Software Ltd.; Wwise (WaveWorks Interactive Sound Engine) by Audiokinetic Inc; SpeedTree by Interactive Data Visualization, Inc.; Simplygon by Donya Labs AB; PhysX by Nvidia Corporation; DirectX by Microsoft, Gamebryo Lightspeed game engine from Emergent (previously NetImmerse Engine) and others.
