= Measure Map Pro format =

Measure Map Pro
- Filename extensions: .mmp
- Internet media type: net.victoralonso.measuremappro.mmp
- Developed by: Blue Blink One
- Type of format: GIS file format
- Extended from: XML

Measure Map Pro format (MMP) is an XML notation to store GIS information in two-dimensional or three-dimensional maps. It was created by Blue Blink One to store information about Polygons, Polylines and Spots including georeferenced labelling, grids and comments.

== Structure ==
The MMP file includes a set of geometries (Polygon, Polylines, Spots) that can be represented on a map and are georeferenced using WGS84 coordinates. It includes RGB colors for lines and areas and information associated to the geometries.

An example MMP document is:

<?xml version="1.0" encoding="UTF-8"?>
<POLYGONS>
	<DATE>Nov 4, 2019 at 12:06:52 PM</DATE>
	<POLYGON>
		<NAME>Polygon 1</NAME>
		<DESCRIPTION>This is polygon 1</DESCRIPTION>
		<ISHOLE>0</ISHOLE>
		<BLOCKED>1</BLOCKED>
		<SHAPE>0</SHAPE>
		<NOSURFACE>0</NOSURFACE>
		<SHOWPINS>0</SHOWPINS>
		<SHOWDISTANCES>1</SHOWDISTANCES>
		<LINECOLOR>0</LINECOLOR>
		<LINECUSTOMCOLOR>FF0000</LINECUSTOMCOLOR>
		<LINEWIDTH>3</LINEWIDTH>
		<AREACOLOR>1</AREACOLOR>
		<AREACUSTOMCOLOR>0000FF</AREACUSTOMCOLOR>
		<AREATRANSPARENCY>7</AREATRANSPARENCY>
		<SHOWNAME>1</SHOWNAME>
		<SHOWAREAMEASURE>1</SHOWAREAMEASURE>
		<SHOWPERIMETERMEASURE>1</SHOWPERIMETERMEASURE>
		<COORDINATEPOLYGONLABELLATITUDE>39.483491319510904</COORDINATEPOLYGONLABELLATITUDE>
		<COORDINATEPOLYGONLABELLONGITUDE>-0.38401111640411045</COORDINATEPOLYGONLABELLONGITUDE>
		<COORDINATEPERIMETERLABELLATITUDE>-0.62838414457228</COORDINATEPERIMETERLABELLATITUDE>
		<COORDINATEPERIMETERLABELLONGITUDE>0.0</COORDINATEPERIMETERLABELLONGITUDE>
		<COORDINATEAREALABELLATITUDE>-1.099626787266999</COORDINATEAREALABELLATITUDE>
		<COORDINATEAREALABELLONGITUDE>0.0</COORDINATEAREALABELLONGITUDE>
		<POINTS>
			<POINT>
				<LAT>39.483425319129395</LAT>
				<LONG>-0.38431018270924255</LONG>
			</POINT>
			<POINT>
				<LAT>39.48365200038984</LAT>
				<LONG>-0.38408890046557076</LONG>
			</POINT>
			<POINT>
				<LAT>39.483490528882754</LAT>
				<LONG>-0.38371205009897835</LONG>
				<DESCPOINT>
					<SHOWDESC>1</SHOWDESC>
					<SHOWDESCINREPORT>1</SHOWDESCINREPORT>
					<DESC>This is a description</DESC>
					<DESCLAT>39.483490528882754</DESCLAT>
					<DESCLONG>-0.38371205009897835</DESCLONG>
				</DESCPOINT>
			</POINT>
			<POINT>
				<LAT>39.48333063863197</LAT>
				<LONG>-0.38400522864250775</LONG>
			</POINT>
			<POINT>
				<LAT>39.483425319129395</LAT>
				<LONG>-0.38431018270924255</LONG>
			</POINT>
		</POINTS>
		<GRID>
			<CELLWIDTH>3.048000000000003</CELLWIDTH>
			<CELLHEIGHT>3.048000000000003</CELLHEIGHT>
			<BEARING>0.0</BEARING>
			<REFLATITUDE>39.48348022551208</REFLATITUDE>
			<REFLONGITUDE>-0.38402675914213347</REFLONGITUDE>
			<SHOWGRID>1</SHOWGRID>
		</GRID>
	</POLYGON>
	<POLYGON>
		<NAME>Polygon 3</NAME>
		<ISHOLE>0</ISHOLE>
		<BLOCKED>1</BLOCKED>
		<SHAPE>0</SHAPE>
		<NOSURFACE>0</NOSURFACE>
		<SHOWPINS>0</SHOWPINS>
		<SHOWDISTANCES>1</SHOWDISTANCES>
		<LINECOLOR>0</LINECOLOR>
		<LINECUSTOMCOLOR>FF0000</LINECUSTOMCOLOR>
		<LINEWIDTH>3</LINEWIDTH>
		<AREACOLOR>1</AREACOLOR>
		<AREACUSTOMCOLOR>0000FF</AREACUSTOMCOLOR>
		<AREATRANSPARENCY>7</AREATRANSPARENCY>
		<SHOWNAME>1</SHOWNAME>
		<SHOWAREAMEASURE>1</SHOWAREAMEASURE>
		<SHOWPERIMETERMEASURE>0</SHOWPERIMETERMEASURE>
		<COORDINATEPOLYGONLABELLATITUDE>39.48394123166483</COORDINATEPOLYGONLABELLATITUDE>
		<COORDINATEPOLYGONLABELLONGITUDE>-0.38271287370835694</COORDINATEPOLYGONLABELLONGITUDE>
		<COORDINATEPERIMETERLABELLATITUDE>0.0</COORDINATEPERIMETERLABELLATITUDE>
		<COORDINATEPERIMETERLABELLONGITUDE>0.0</COORDINATEPERIMETERLABELLONGITUDE>
		<COORDINATEAREALABELLATITUDE>39.48385075907382</COORDINATEAREALABELLATITUDE>
		<COORDINATEAREALABELLONGITUDE>-0.38271287370835694</COORDINATEAREALABELLONGITUDE>
		<POINTS>
			<POINT>
				<LAT>39.48410602155221</LAT>
				<LONG>-0.38301848908864145</LONG>
			</POINT>
			<POINT>
				<LAT>39.4842805036605</LAT>
				<LONG>-0.3825395521091366</LONG>
			</POINT>
			<POINT>
				<LAT>39.48377773550993</LAT>
				<LONG>-0.38240725832807243</LONG>
			</POINT>
			<POINT>
				<LAT>39.48360195966916</LAT>
				<LONG>-0.38291298898477066</LONG>
			</POINT>
			<POINT>
				<LAT>39.48410602155221</LAT>
				<LONG>-0.38301848908864145</LONG>
			</POINT>
		</POINTS>
		<GRID>
			<CELLWIDTH>6.096000000000006</CELLWIDTH>
			<CELLHEIGHT>6.096000000000006</CELLHEIGHT>
			<BEARING>0.0</BEARING>
			<REFLATITUDE>39.48388639368251</REFLATITUDE>
			<REFLONGITUDE>-0.38272089261207287</REFLONGITUDE>
			<SHOWGRID>1</SHOWGRID>
		</GRID>
	</POLYGON>
	<SPOT>
		<NAME>spot 1</NAME>
		<SHOWNAME>1</SHOWNAME>
		<ICON>0</ICON>
		<LAT>39.48380422970726</LAT>
		<LONG>-0.3833288364170926</LONG>
		<COORDINATESPOTNAMELATITUDE>39.483762826883066</COORDINATESPOTNAMELATITUDE>
		<COORDINATESPOTNAMELONGITUDE>-0.3833288364170926</COORDINATESPOTNAMELONGITUDE>
		<ALT>-0.3833288364170926</ALT>
	</SPOT>
	<SPOT>
		<NAME>Spot 2</NAME>
		<SHOWNAME>1</SHOWNAME>
		<ICON>0</ICON>
		<LAT>39.483327514732565</LAT>
		<LONG>-0.3835867896154639</LONG>
		<COORDINATESPOTNAMELATITUDE>39.48331716395788</COORDINATESPOTNAMELATITUDE>
		<COORDINATESPOTNAMELONGITUDE>-0.3835867896154639</COORDINATESPOTNAMELONGITUDE>
		<ALT>-0.3835867896154639</ALT>
	</SPOT>
</POLYGONS>

== Geodetic reference systems in MMP ==
For its reference system, MMP uses 3D geographic coordinates: longitude, latitude and altitude, in that order, with negative values for west, south and below mean sea level if the altitude data is available. The longitude, latitude components (decimal degrees) are as defined by the World Geodetic System of 1984 (WGS84). The vertical component (altitude) is measured in meters from the WGS84 EGM96 Geoid vertical datum.

== See also ==
- Keyhole Markup Language
- Geography Markup Language
- Geospatial content management system
- Google Earth
- GPS eXchange Format
- GeoJSON
