= MMP =

MMP may refer to:

== Computing and video games ==
- Massively multi-player, a type of online game
- Massively multiprocessing, large symmetric multiprocessing (SMP) computer systems
- Measure Map Pro format, a GIS format

== Science and mathematics ==
- Matrix metalloproteinase enzymes
- Methuselah Mouse Prize, for research into slowing cellular ageing
- Millennium Mathematics Project, of the University of Cambridge
- Moscow Mathematical Papyrus, an ancient Egyptian mathematical papyrus
- Matrilysin, an enzyme
- Minimal model program, a branch of birational geometry
- Million progressive motile (million motile sperm cells per milliliter), a measure of male fertility used in semen analysis

== Politics ==
- Mixed-member proportional representation, a voting system used in Germany, New Zealand and other countries
- Minuteman Project, 2005 action to deter illegal immigration
- National Struggle Party (Milli Mücadele Partisi), a nationalist political party in Turkey

== Industry and labor ==
- International Organization of Masters, Mates & Pilots (MM&P), a maritime labor union
- Moldova Metallurgical Plant, see Moldova Steel Works
- Maintenance management professional, a Canadian job qualification
- Mitsubishi Motors Philippines, an automotive manufacturer

== Sport ==
- Memphis Motorsports Park, a race track in Millington, Tennessee, United States
- Minute Maid Park, a ballpark in Houston, Texas, United States
- Miller Motorsports Park in Tooele County, Utah.

== Fiction ==
- Mass market paperback, a bookbinding format
- Tokyo Mew Mew, also known as Mew Mew Power, a Japanese cartoon
- Miss Moneypenny, secretary to James Bond's boss
- Mighty Math Powers, a method that Team Umizoomi uses

== Others ==
- Magellan Midstream Partners, a publicly traded partnership
- Marian Movement of Priests, a Catholic organization
- Multi-Man Publishing, a wargame company
- Metal Mind Productions, a Polish music label
- Monday Morning Podcast, a weekly comedy podcast by Bill Burr
- Marchwood Military Port, a Military Port in Marchwood, England
- Military Mounted Police, a former corps of the British Army
- Missile Moyenne Portée (MMP), a French anti-tank missile
- Mucous membrane pemphigoid
- Marilyn Monroe Productions
