= Blue Marble Geographics =

Coordinates: 44°17′37.36″N 69°48′14.54″W

- Type: Private
- Industry: GIS software
- Founded: Maine (1993)
- Headquarters: Hallowell, Maine, U.S.
- Key people: Jeremy Parker (Chief Executive Officer); Dr Rahul Gandhi (Chief Operating Officer); Victor Minor (Chief Technology Officer)
- Products: Geographic Calculator, Global Mapper
- Parent: Eterna Growth Partners
- Website: bluemarblegeo.com

Blue Marble Geographics is a developer and provider of geographic information system software products focused on data translation. They provide software products and services for working with GIS data in different formats.

Blue Marble Geographics is a member of the Open Geospatial Consortium.

== Products ==
=== Geographic Calculator ===
Blue Marble Geographics' first software product, Geographic Calculator, was developed in 1992 and released in 1993. The Geographic Calculator is a coordinate conversion library with a database of coordinate mathematical objects, including projections, coordinate systems, datums, ellipsoids, as well as linear and angular units. The tool is primarily used to translate map coordinates from one system to another. In 2004, the underlying GeoCalc library was rewritten, and in 2007, a new version was released as the Blue Marble Desktop.

2013 saw a rebranding of the Blue Marble Desktop back to Geographic Calculator. Blue Marble Geographics incorporated all of the functionality of the Blue Marble Desktop, including the Geographic Transformer, Translator, and Spatial Connect products, into the new Geographic Calculator. This introduced an easier-to-follow annual naming convention with one or two service pack updates between releases.

=== Global Mapper ===
Global Mapper is a geographic information system software package currently developed by Blue Marble Geographics that runs on Microsoft Windows. Global Mapper handles both vector, raster, and elevation data, and provides viewing, conversion, and other general GIS features.

In 1995, the USGS was in need of a Windows viewer for their data products, so they developed the dlgv32 application for viewing their DLG (Digital Line Graph) vector data products. Between 1995 and 1998, the dlgv32 application was expanded to include support for viewing other USGS data products, including DRG (topographic maps) and DEM (digital elevation model), and SDTS-DLG and SDTS-DEM data products. The development process is described in detail in the USGS paper titled 'A Programming Exercise'.

In 1998, the USGS released the source code for dlgv32 v3.7 to the public domain.

In 2001, the source code for dlgv32 was further developed by a private individual into the commercial product dlgv32 Pro v4.0 and offered for sale via the internet. Later that same year, the product was renamed to Global Mapper and became a commercial product of the company Global Mapper Software LLC. The USGS was distributing a version of the software under the name dlgv32 Pro (Global Mapper).

Blue Marble Geographics acquired Global Mapper, LLC at the end of 2011. Mike Childs, the original developer of Global Mapper, continues to work for Blue Marble as a lead developer.

In 2013, Blue Marble released a major version update to Global Mapper that also introduced the new Global Mapper LiDAR Module. The Global Mapper LiDAR Module offers optional enhancements to the base Global Mapper application and provides numerous advanced LiDAR processing tools (e.g., automatic point cloud classification, automatic extraction of buildings, trees, and powerlines, cross-sectional viewing and point editing, custom digitizing or extraction of 3D line and area features, etc.).

== Company history ==
Blue Marble Geographics was established in 1993 and was originally located in Gardiner, Maine. The company founder, Jeffrey Bennett Cole, retired in 2003, and Patrick Cunningham took over as President, adding employees and re-focusing the product offering over the next few years. In 2008, they received the Governor’s Award for technology company of the year at the TechMaine technology awards showcase. Blue Marble is one of a handful of geospatial or GIS software companies to come out of Maine in the nineties. The company's founder studied at the University of Maine and, like other well-known GIS companies from the state, its roots are tied to the surveying and forestry programs of the University of Maine. After years of growing, the company has moved its home office to Hallowell, Maine.

In April 2026, Blue Marble Geographics was acquired by Eterna Growth partners, a private equity firm, and combined with Avenza Systems, Inc. which was acquired at the same time.

== See also ==
- The Blue Marble, 1972 NASA photograph taken by the crew of Apollo 17
