= DAFIF =

Database of up-to-date aeronautical data

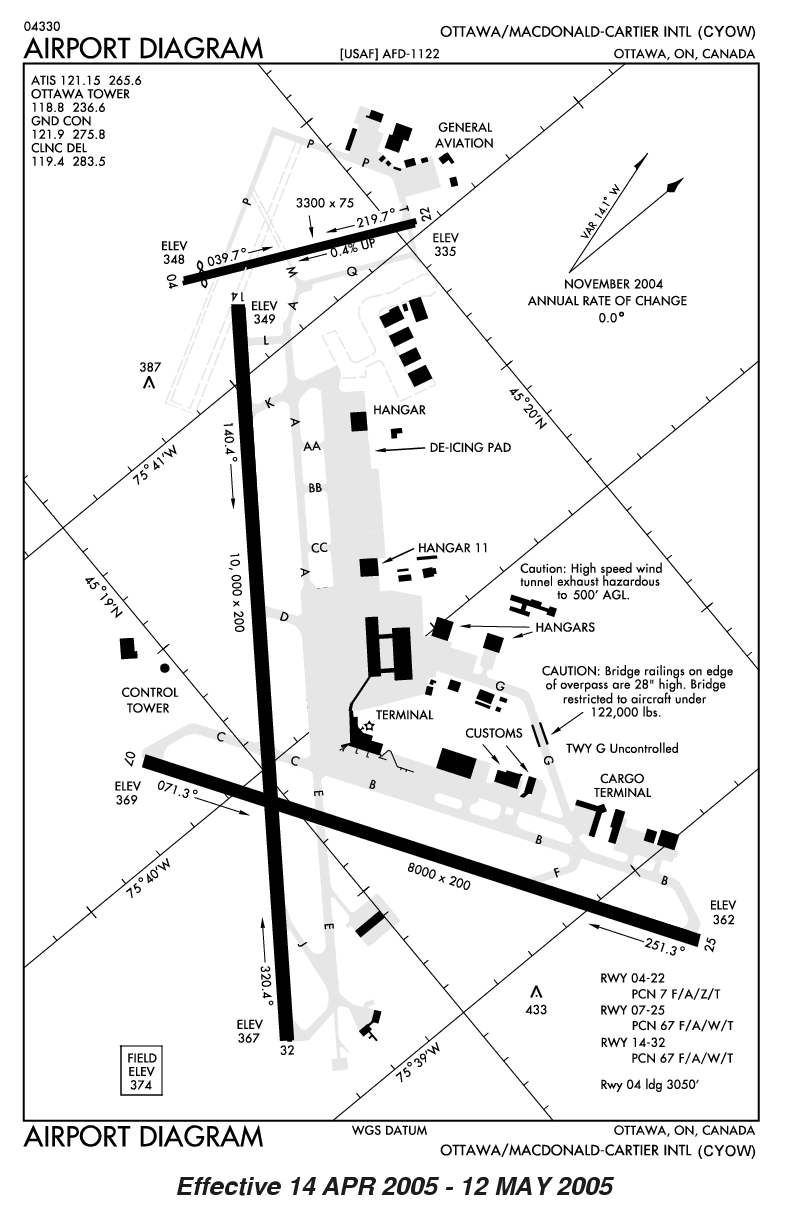
DAFIF diagram of Ottawa International Airport

The Digital Aeronautical Flight Information File or DAFIF (/ˈdeɪfɪf/) is a comprehensive database of up-to-date aeronautical data, including information on airports, airways, airspaces, navigation data, and other facts relevant to flying in the entire world, managed by the National Geospatial-Intelligence Agency (NGA) of the United States.

== Withdrawal of public access ==
DAFIF was publicly available until October 2006 through the Internet; however, it was closed to public access because "increased numbers of foreign source providers are claiming intellectual property rights or are forewarning NGA that they intend to copyright their source". Currently, only federal and state government agencies, authorized government contractors, and Department of Defense customers are able to access the DAFIF data.

At the time of the announcement, the NGA did not say who the "foreign source providers" were. It was subsequently revealed that the Australian Government was behind the move. The Australian government-owned corporation Airservices Australia in September 2003 started charging for access to Australian data. Rather than exclude the Australian data, the NGA opted to stop making the data available to the public.

== USFIF ==
A product called USFIF (pronounced as yoos-fəf) or the United States Flight Information File which contains only data related to the United States was available on the NGA website until October 2007. NGA no longer hosts any aeronautical information on the publicly available website.

== Replacement for Google Earth data ==
Since the DAFIF data has ceased to be available to the public, new sources of the data have arrived, though none is (yet) a complete replacement:

- In Google Earth format (KML) Google Earth 3D Airspace
- Started soon after the withdrawal of the DAFIF data, the OurAirports web site is a community effort to produce an open (public domain) database of airports and navigation aids—nightly CSV data dumps are available from the site. Since OurAirports is open source, there are a lot of duplicate airports in the system and the data is not necessarily accurate as an official source would be.
- OpenStreetMap holds information about many aerodromes, and can be downloaded through the Overpass service.
- In other open formats, publicly contributed data, the Worldwide Soaring Turnpoint Exchange: Airspace
