= Polygon Cruncher =

3D computer graphics software

- Developer(s): Mootools
- Stable release: 10.0
- Operating system: Windows
- License: Proprietary
- Website: http://www.mootools.com/

Polygon Cruncher is 3D computer graphics software for generating 3D-optimized meshes based on reduction and other optimization techniques. Polygon Cruncher is also available as an API through an SDK.

== Overview ==
Polygon Cruncher was initially created in 1999 for Kalisto Entertainment. It was originally based on an algorithm proposed by Michael Garland. The algorithm uses iterative contractions of vertex pairs to simplify models and maintains surface error approximations using quadric matrices. The process reduces the number of triangular polygons with minimal loss of detail.

Polygon Cruncher simplifies meshes and retains most details even while reducing polygons by as much as 95%. Texture information, vertex colors, and specified normals are taken into account during optimization, as well as many others settings. For example, it is possible to define a symmetry axis in order to produce symmetrical low-resolution meshes.

Polygon Cruncher has the ability to generate a dynamic mesh (also called multi-resolution mesh) once the optimization has been computed. This feature allows selection of the most appropriate LOD for the mesh in real time and is demonstrated in the Polygon Cruncher OpenGL viewer integrated to the software.

The Polygon Cruncher API is exposed in a C++ library. A feature allows serialized optimization to produce pre-optimized 3D assets for contexts such as video games, CAD, or other real-time visualization processes.

== Supported Platforms ==
Polygon Cruncher software is running on Windows operating system. It is available as a plugin for:

- Autodesk 3ds Max
- Autodesk Maya
- Newtek Lightwave
- 3DBrowser.

In the 3D Photo Browser, Polygon Cruncher is able to simplify various 3D formats such as Maya, Wavefront, TrueSpace, SketchUp, XSI, COLLADA, DXF, etc.

The Polygon Cruncher API is available for developers through a C++ SDK. This library is currently used by different companies such Autodesk® (3ds Max®), Act-3D (Lumion®), Anark® (Anark Core Platform®).
