= FME (software) =

Geospatial ETL Software

- Example FME workflow
- Release: November 1996; 30 years ago
- Stable release: 2026.2.1 / August 11, 2026; 3 months ago
- Written in: C++
- Operating system: Windows, MacOS, Linux
- Type: Data integration, Geographic information system
- License: Proprietary commercial software
- Website: fme.safe.com

FME, (also known as Feature Manipulation Engine), is a data integration platform developed by Safe Software, a Vancouver-based software company founded by Don Murray and Dale Lutz.

== History ==
The Safe Software company was started in 1993 by Don Murray and Dale Lutz, who had previously worked together at MDA Space. Their first big project was a contract for the Canadian Government focused on data exchange to track logging activities. The company name itself came out of this project, based upon the acronym for the Spatial Archive and Interchange Format which was the required data exchange method. The FME software itself evolved out of this contract and the first build was released in 1996. Much of the early success of the software was driven by the ability to translate data between CAD and GIS formats, and the interoperability with Esri software.

In January 2024 JMI Equity obtained a minor share of Safe Software. Safe Software wants to triple the net annual revenue in the next five years.

== Software ==
The base product is FME Form (formerly FME Desktop); this is a standalone software package with an interface that enables the user to graphically build workflows for data translation, automation, and format and coordinate conversion. FME Flow (formerly FME Server) is an 'on-premises' solution that permits on demand server based instantiations of tailored FME workflows. FME Flow Hosted (formerly FME Cloud) is similar to FME Flow however is hosted 'as needed' in the AWS Cloud.

FME data transformation workflows typically consist of a combination of the following 'building blocks':

1. Readers to input from single or multiple data sources in a variety of formats or databases.
2. Transformers to manipulate, transform and analyse the data.
3. Writers to output the data in a number of different formats.

Any number of readers, writers and transformers can be used in an FME workflow. A further tool is the Data Inspector, which can present spatial workflow results in a cartographic display.

The ArcGIS Pro software can use the FME engine and workflows as part of the data interoperability extension. In 2015 the FME software was integrated with the What3Words geolocation system.

== Use and adoption ==
As of November 2022, FME has an estimated 0.32% of the total data integration software market. The Information Technology, governmental, utilities, and oil and gas sectors form the largest organisational user base. Examples of the use of FME include routing for emergency fire response, backend data quality management and sub-surface modelling for infrastructure projects, CAD to GIS file conversions, and BIM data extraction for indoor navigation.

== Criticism and Reviews ==
FME is considered a comprehensive platform for BIM data exchange and support of spatial data. Reviews indicate it is strong in the analytic, conversion and interoperability areas, flexible in scope, with a strong user community. However, the cartographic capability is considered poor, interactive editing tools are absent, and the licensing costs are seen as significant.

== See also ==
- Geographic information system software
- QGIS – Geographic information system software
- GDAL – Translator library for raster and vector geospatial data formats
- ArcGIS – Geographic information system maintained by Esri
- File format (GIS) – Standard for encoding geographical information
