= Simplygon =

3D computer graphics software for automatic 3D optimization

- Original author(s): Donya Labs AB
- Developer(s): Simplygon Studios (part of Xbox Game Studios)
- Stable release: 10.4
- Operating system: Windows
- License: Proprietary
- Website: simplygon.com

Simplygon is 3D computer graphics software for automatic 3D optimization, based on proprietary methods for creating levels of detail (LODs) through Polygon mesh reduction and other optimization techniques.

Since the launch of Simplygon, the product has been licensed by a number of AAA game studios, for multi-platform games, and used in areas such as architecture, 3D CAD, 3D scan, 3D web and 3D printing.

The algorithms in Simplygon are designed to also optimize different type of input forms, and a number of visualization projects outside gaming are currently deploying this technology in areas such as architecture, 3D CAD, 3D scan, 3D web and 3D printing.

== History ==
The Swedish company Donya Labs was founded in 2006 in Linköping. Donya Labs developed Simplygon with the vision to optimize the handling of 3D graphics to allow game developers to focus on making good games. In January 2017, Simplygon was acquired by Microsoft. In 2019, Simplygon Studios became a part of Xbox Game Studios division.

== Technology ==
Simplygon's optimization processes are:

Reduction

A reduction process reduces the amount of data while preserving all relevant original vertex data.

Remeshing

A remeshing process generates a new replacement mesh, often used to replace a group of objects with one so called proxy object.

Aggregation

An aggregation process combines all geometry and materials in a scene into one single object.

Impostor

An imposter model maps all geometric details as textures and can be used if a model will be viewed from a distance and a certain direction.

Occlusion mesh

An occlusion mesh process generates a silhouette based geometry that removes internal features and concavities.

== Process integration ==
=== API/SDK ===
Simplygon is available as an API for C++, C# and Python allowing customized Simplygon integration.

=== Plug-in ===
Simplygon is available as a plug-in for the following digital content creation tools:

- Autodesk 3ds Max
- Autodesk Maya
- Blender
- Houdini

=== Games industry use ===
Simplygon integration is available for the following game engines:

- Unreal Engine
- Unity

== Awards ==
Simplygon won a 2015 The Independent Games Developers Association TIGA Games industry award in the category “Best Technology Innovation”. Donya Labs was ranked 9th in the Deloitte Technology Fast 50, 2014.
