= GeoPackage =

GIS data format

- Filename extension: .gpkg
- Internet media type: application/geopackage+sqlite3
- Developed by: Open Geospatial Consortium
- Initial release: 13 February 2014; 11 years ago
- Latest release: 1.4; 6 February 2024; 13 months ago
- Type of format: Geographic information system
- Contained by: SQLite
- Standard: OGC GeoPackage Encoding Standard
- Open format?: Yes
- Website: OGC GeoPackage Standard Working Group

GeoPackage (GPKG) is an open, non-proprietary, platform-independent and standards-based data format for geographic information systems built as a set of conventions over a SQLite database. Defined by the Open Geospatial Consortium (OGC) with the backing of the US military and published in 2014, GeoPackage has seen widespread support from various government, commercial, and open source organizations.

== Origin ==
Despite dozens of file formats and services for exchanging geospatial data, there was not an open format which could support both raster and vector data, while being efficiently decodable by software, particularly in mobile devices. This need was formally expressed at the OGC in 2012. The candidate standard was approved by the OGC in February 2014.

== Format ==
A GeoPackage is defined as a SQLite 3 database file with a specific database schema and with filename extension .gpkg. The schema defines data and metadata tables with specified definitions, integrity assertions, format limitations and content constraints.

The GeoPackage standard describes a set of conventions (requirements) for storing vector features, tile matrix sets of imagery and raster maps at various scales, schema and metadata.

A GeoPackage can be extended by using the extension rules as defined in clause 2.3 of the standard. The OGC GeoPackage standard specifies a set of OGC member approved extensions in Annex F. Additional (vendor-specific) extensions may also be added by following the rules for GeoPackage extensions, however doing so can impact interoperability.

GeoPackage was designed to be as lightweight as possible and be contained in one ready-to-use single file. This makes it suitable for mobile applications in disconnected mode and rapid sharing on cloud storage, USB drives, etc. The GeoPackage extension F.3 RTree Spatial Indexes specifies how to use SQLite spatial indexes in order to speed up performance on spatial queries compared to traditional geospatial files formats.
