= Progressive meshes =

Technique used in dynamic level of detail

Progressive meshes is one of the techniques of dynamic level of detail (LOD). This technique was introduced by Hugues Hoppe in 1996. This method uses saving a model to the structure - the progressive mesh, which allows a smooth choice of detail levels depending on the current view. Practically, this means that it is possible to display whole model with the lowest level of detail at once, and then gradually add more detail where needed. Among the disadvantages, it requires considerable memory consumption compared to a simple static mesh of the same detail currently displayed. The advantage is that it can work adaptively in real time. The technique can also be applied to gradually transmit increasing detail across a lower bandwidth medium such as an internet connection (a 3d mesh analog of progressive jpeg).

== Basic principle ==
A progressive mesh is a data structure which is created as the original model of the best quality simplifies a suitable decimation algorithm, which removes step by step some of the edges in the model (edge-collapse operation). It is necessary to undertake as many simplifications as needed to achieve the minimal model. The resultant model, in a full quality, is then represented by the minimal model and by the sequence of inverse operations to simplistic (vertex split operation). This forms a hierarchical structure which helps to create a model in the chosen level of detail.

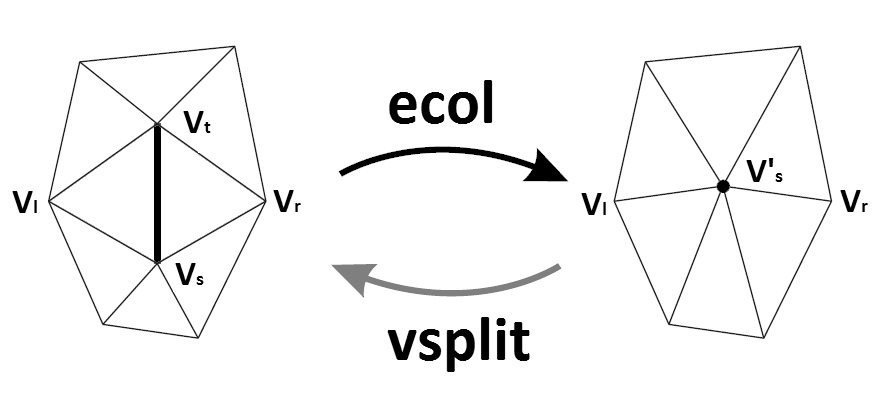

=== Edge collapse ===
This simplistic operation - ecol takes two connected vertices and replaces them with a single vertex. Two triangles {v_{s}, v_{t}, v_{l}} and {v_{t}, v_{s}, v_{r}} which were connected by the edge are also removed during this operation.

=== Vertex split ===
Vertex split (vsplit) is the inverse operation to the edge collapse that divides the vertex into two new vertices. Therefore, a new edge {v_{t}, v_{s}} and two new triangles {v_{s}, v_{t}, v_{l}} and {v_{t}, v_{s}, v_{r}} arise.
