= SuperMap =

- Type: Public
- Industry: Software; Geographic Information Systems (GIS)
- Founded: Beijing, China PR (1997)
- Key people: Zhong Ershun, Founder/Chairman; Song Guanfu, Founder/President
- Products: SuperMap GIS 10i-Cloud GIS Server, Edge GIS Server, Terminal GIS for PC, Terminal GIS for Web, Terminal GIS for Mobile, Online GIS Platform
- Revenue: 200 million USD year 2018
- Number of employees: 4,000 (China)
- Website: www.supermap.com

SuperMap is a Geographic Information System (GIS) software products and services provider and IT enterprise in Asia. The headquarters are in Beijing, China. The company was founded in 1997. It has over 20 branch offices in China and one office in Tokyo, Japan. SuperMap has developed many agencies and partners all over the world including South Korea and Malaysia. In 2009, SuperMap was listed in Shenzhen Stock Exchange of China (300036.SZ). In 2018 revenues were about $200 million. In 2015, SuperMap occupied 31.6% of Chinese GIS market share, listed as number 1 of Chinese market share. According to the Geographic Information Systems Market Research Study Report 2019 released by ARC Advisory Group, SuperMap has the 3rd largest share in global GIS market, and the 1st largest share in Asia GIS market.

== Introduction ==
SuperMap Software Co., Ltd. is a GIS platform software and service provider. It was founded in 1997 in Beijing (headquarter). Now, SuperMap has more than 4,000 employees and has established companies in Hong Kong and Tokyo for international business development. SuperMap has developed agencies and partners all over the world including South Korea, and Malaysia. The most important milestone is that SuperMap was the first listed GIS software company in China in 2009. Now, SuperMap has become one of the largest GIS platform manufacturers in the world.

SuperMap focuses on providing GIS platform software for various industries, such as smart city, land management, real estate, urban planning, pipeline management, and public service. Meanwhile, SuperMap has entered Asia, Europe, Africa and South America and other countries and regions, and has developed distributors and partners from over 30 countries and end users from over 100 countries.

== SuperMap GIS ==
SuperMap GIS is developed by SuperMap Software Co., Ltd and it is a complete integration of a series of GIS platform software, including Desktop GIS, Service GIS, Component GIS and Mobile GIS platforms and spatial data production, processing and management tools.

The Latest Products- SuperMap GIS 10i includes Big Data GIS, AI GIS, New 3D GIS, Cloud Native GIS and Cross Platform GIS.

== History ==
1997: SuperMap was founded

2000: SuperMap Japan was founded

2000: Large-scale Component GIS Platform – SuperMap GIS 2000 was released

2005: The first cross-platform GIS Software in the world – SuperMap Universal GIS was released

2006: SuperMap International was founded in Hong Kong

2008: The National Sales and Service Network was established

2009: Listed in Shenzhen Stock Exchange

2009: The first 2D & 3D integration GIS platform – SuperMap GIS 6R was released

2013: Cloud & terminal integration platform – SuperMap GIS 7C was released

2015: Upgraded cloud & terminal GIS platform – SuperMap GIS 8C was released

2015: Full acquisition of Shanghai NanKang Technology Co., Ltd.

2016: Full acquisition of Nanjing Guotu Information Industry Co., Ltd. and Beijing Antu I2m Corporation Ltd.

2017: Expand International Business, representative office in Indonesia.

2018: Release new version, cloud and terminal integration, new 3D Generation and BIG DATA GIS, SuperMap 9D

2019: Release SuperMap GIS 10i includes Cloud GIS server, Edge GIS server, Terminal GIS, Online GIS platform, and combines with AI technology.

== Acquisitions ==
In order to broaden the markets of the real estate registration, SuperMap has acquired Shanghai Nankang Technology Co., Ltd. in 2015, Nanjing Guotu Information Industry Co., Ltd. and Beijing Antu I2M Corporation Ltd. in 2016.
