= National Transfer Format =

The National Transfer Format (NTF) is a file format designed in 1988 specifically for the transfer of geospatial information; it is administered by the British Standards Institution. It is now the standard transfer format for Ordnance Survey digital data. The present version (2.0) conforms to BS 7567.

It has three parts:

- Part 1: Specification for NTF structures
- Part 2: Specification for implementing plain NTF
- Part 3: Specification for implementing NTF using BS 6690 (= ISO 8211)
