= Global Mapper =

Global Mapper is a geographic information system (GIS) software package currently developed by Blue Marble Geographics that runs on Microsoft Windows. The GIS software competes with ESRI, GeoMedia, Manifold System, and MapInfo GIS products. Global Mapper handles both vector, raster, and elevation data, and provides viewing, conversion, and other general GIS features. It is most notably known for its support of over 300 different file formats ranging from .laz to Geotiffs. Global Mapper has an active user community with a mailing list and online forums.

== History ==
In 1995 the USGS was in need of a Windows viewer for their data products, Mike Childs, intern at the time developed the dlgv32 application for viewing their DLG (Digital Line Graph) vector data products. Between 1995 and 1998 the dlgv32 application was expanded to include support for viewing other USGS data products, including DRG (topographic maps) and DEM (digital elevation model) and SDTS-DLG and SDTS-DEM data products. The development process is described in detail in the USGS paper titled 'A Programming Exercise'.

In 1998 the USGS released the source code for dlgv32 v3.7 to the public domain. In 2001, the source code for dlgv32 was further developed by Mike into the commercial product dlgv32 Pro v4.0 and offered for sale via the internet. Later that same year the product was renamed to Global Mapper and become a commercial product of the company Global Mapper Software LLC. Mike capitalized on this opportunity and acted as the salesperson, developer and tech support for almost a decade.

On November 2, 2011 Blue Marble Geographics, at the annual user conference, announced they had purchased Global Mapper LLC. Mike Childs joined Blue Marble Geographics after the sale, and remains a key developer and guru of the software.

== Releases ==
Since the initial commercialization of the Global Mapper product in 2001, there have been yearly major product releases and numerous intermediate point releases adding additional functionality to the software.

A mobile version of Global Mapper, Global Mapper Mobile, was released in 2016.

== Versions ==
Version	ReleaseDate	ProgramName	Owner	Edition	MustRegister	ReleaseDateGuess	IsOpenSouce
01.00	1997-06-20	dlgv32 Pro	USGS	32 Bit		Y	N
01.05	1997-07-07	dlgv32 Pro	USGS	32 Bit		Y	N
02.00	1998-04-01	dlgv32 Pro	USGS	32 Bit		Y	N
03.00	1998-07-31	dlgv32 Pro	USGS	32 Bit		Y	N
03.05	1998-12-01	dlgv32 Pro	USGS	32 Bit		Y	N
03.06	1998-12-10	dlgv32 Pro	USGS	32 Bit		Y	N
03.07	1999-12-15	dlgv32 Pro	USGS	32 Bit		Y	N
04.00	2000-01-11	dlgv32 Pro	USGS	32 Bit		Y	Y
04.01	2000-02-07	dlgv32 Pro	USGS	32 Bit		Y	N
04.02	2000-03-03	dlgv32 Pro	USGS	32 Bit		Y	N
04.03	2000-03-31	dlgv32 Pro	USGS	32 Bit		Y	N
04.04	2000-04-28	dlgv32 Pro	USGS	32 Bit		Y	N
04.05	2000-05-25	dlgv32 Pro	USGS	32 Bit		Y	N
04.06	2000-06-22	dlgv32 Pro	USGS	32 Bit		Y	N
04.07	2000-07-19	dlgv32 Pro	USGS	32 Bit		Y	N
04.08	2000-08-15	dlgv32 Pro	USGS	32 Bit		Y	N
04.09	2000-09-11	dlgv32 Pro	USGS	32 Bit		Y	N
04.10	2000-10-06	dlgv32 Pro	USGS	32 Bit		Y	N
04.11	2000-11-03	dlgv32 Pro	USGS	32 Bit		Y	N
04.12	2000-12-01	dlgv32 Pro	USGS	32 Bit		Y	N
04.13	2000-12-28	dlgv32 Pro	USGS	32 Bit		Y	N
04.14	2001-01-24	dlgv32 Pro	USGS	32 Bit		Y	N
04.15	2001-02-20	dlgv32 Pro	USGS	32 Bit		Y	N
04.16	2001-03-19	dlgv32 Pro	USGS	32 Bit		Y	N
04.17	2001-04-13	dlgv32 Pro	USGS	32 Bit		Y	N
04.18	2001-05-11	dlgv32 Pro	USGS	32 Bit		Y	N
04.19	2001-06-08	dlgv32 Pro	USGS	32 Bit		Y	N
04.20	2001-07-06	dlgv32 Pro	USGS	32 Bit		Y	N
04.21	2001-08-02	dlgv32 Pro	USGS	32 Bit		Y	N
04.22	2001-08-29	dlgv32 Pro	USGS	32 Bit		Y	N
04.23	2001-09-25	dlgv32 Pro	USGS	32 Bit		Y	N
04.24	2001-10-22	dlgv32 Pro	USGS	32 Bit		Y	N
04.25	2001-11-18	Global Mapper	USGS	32 Bit			N
04.26	2001-11-25	Global Mapper	USGS	32 Bit			N
04.27	2001-12-02	Global Mapper	USGS	32 Bit			N
04.28	2001-12-09	Global Mapper	USGS	32 Bit			N
04.29	2001-12-16	Global Mapper	USGS	32 Bit			N
04.30	2001-12-18	Global Mapper	USGS	32 Bit			N
04.31	2001-12-25	Global Mapper	USGS	32 Bit			N
04.32	2002-01-01	Global Mapper	USGS	32 Bit			N
04.33	2002-01-17	Global Mapper	USGS	32 Bit			N
04.34	2002-01-27	Global Mapper	USGS	32 Bit			N
04.35	2002-01-30	Global Mapper	USGS	32 Bit			N
04.36	2002-02-06	Global Mapper	USGS	32 Bit			N
04.37	2002-02-13	Global Mapper	USGS	32 Bit			N
04.38	2002-02-20	Global Mapper	USGS	32 Bit			N
04.39	2002-02-21	Global Mapper	USGS	32 Bit			N
04.40	2002-02-24	Global Mapper	USGS	32 Bit			N
04.41	2002-02-27	Global Mapper	USGS	32 Bit			N
04.42	2002-03-07	Global Mapper	USGS	32 Bit			N
04.43	2002-03-20	Global Mapper	USGS	32 Bit			N
04.44	2002-03-24	Global Mapper	USGS	32 Bit			N
04.45	2002-03-31	Global Mapper	USGS	32 Bit			N
04.46	2002-04-03	Global Mapper	USGS	32 Bit			N
04.47	2002-04-07	Global Mapper	USGS	32 Bit			N
04.48	2002-04-15	Global Mapper	USGS	32 Bit			N
04.49	2002-04-25	Global Mapper	USGS	32 Bit			N
04.50	2002-04-29	Global Mapper	USGS	32 Bit			N
04.51	2002-05-14	Global Mapper	USGS	32 Bit			N
04.52	2002-05-15	Global Mapper	USGS	32 Bit			N
04.53	2002-05-23	Global Mapper	USGS	32 Bit			N
04.54	2002-06-02	Global Mapper	USGS	32 Bit			N
04.55	2002-06-04	Global Mapper	USGS	32 Bit			N
04.56	2002-06-17	Global Mapper	USGS	32 Bit			N
04.57	2002-06-30	Global Mapper	USGS	32 Bit			N
04.58	2002-07-11	Global Mapper	USGS	32 Bit			N
04.59	2002-07-14	Global Mapper	USGS	32 Bit			N
04.60	2002-07-21	Global Mapper	USGS	32 Bit			N
04.61	2002-08-01	Global Mapper	USGS	32 Bit			N
04.62	2002-08-20	Global Mapper	USGS	32 Bit			N
04.63	2002-08-28	Global Mapper	USGS	32 Bit			N
04.64	2002-09-12	Global Mapper	USGS	32 Bit			N
04.65	2002-09-13	Global Mapper	USGS	32 Bit			N
04.66	2002-09-26	Global Mapper	USGS	32 Bit			N
04.67	2002-10-14	Global Mapper	USGS	32 Bit			N
04.68	2002-10-20	Global Mapper	USGS	32 Bit			N
04.69	2002-11-04	Global Mapper	USGS	32 Bit			N
04.70	2002-11-26	Global Mapper	USGS	32 Bit			N
04.71	2002-12-01	Global Mapper	USGS	32 Bit			N
04.72	2002-12-15	Global Mapper	USGS	32 Bit			N
04.73	2003-01-01	Global Mapper	USGS	32 Bit			N
04.74	2003-01-07	Global Mapper	USGS	32 Bit			N
04.75	2003-01-25	Global Mapper	USGS	32 Bit			N
04.76	2003-02-27	Global Mapper	USGS	32 Bit			N
04.77	2003-04-13	Global Mapper	USGS	32 Bit			N
04.78	2003-04-14	Global Mapper	USGS	32 Bit			N
05.00	2003-05-11	Global Mapper	Global Mapper	32 Bit			N
05.01	2003-06-03	Global Mapper	Global Mapper	32 Bit			N
05.02	2003-06-30	Global Mapper	Global Mapper	32 Bit			N
05.03	2003-07-23	Global Mapper	Global Mapper	32 Bit			N
05.04	2003-08-27	Global Mapper	Global Mapper	32 Bit			N
05.05	2003-09-21	Global Mapper	Global Mapper	32 Bit			N
05.06	2003-10-30	Global Mapper	Global Mapper	32 Bit			N
05.07	2003-12-14	Global Mapper	Global Mapper	32 Bit			N
05.08	2004-02-12	Global Mapper	Global Mapper	32 Bit			N
05.09	2004-04-08	Global Mapper	Global Mapper	32 Bit			N
05.10	2004-04-18	Global Mapper	Global Mapper	32 Bit			N
06.00	2004-07-28	Global Mapper	Global Mapper	32 Bit			N
06.01	2004-08-04	Global Mapper	Global Mapper	32 Bit			N
06.02	2004-09-13	Global Mapper	Global Mapper	32 Bit			N
06.03	2004-09-27	Global Mapper	Global Mapper	32 Bit			N
06.04	2004-11-11	Global Mapper	Global Mapper	32 Bit			N
06.05	2004-12-06	Global Mapper	Global Mapper	32 Bit			N
06.06	2005-01-26	Global Mapper	Global Mapper	32 Bit			N
06.07	2005-03-22	Global Mapper	Global Mapper	32 Bit			N
06.08	2005-04-18	Global Mapper	Global Mapper	32 Bit			N
06.09	2005-06-08	Global Mapper	Global Mapper	32 Bit			N
07.00	2005-08-04	Global Mapper	Global Mapper	32 Bit			N
07.01	2005-10-11	Global Mapper	Global Mapper	32 Bit			N
07.02	2005-12-01	Global Mapper	Global Mapper	32 Bit			N
07.03	2006-02-14	Global Mapper	Global Mapper	32 Bit			N
07.04	2006-05-05	Global Mapper	Global Mapper	32 Bit			N
08.00	2006-08-30	Global Mapper	Global Mapper	32 Bit			N
08.01	2006-11-06	Global Mapper	Global Mapper	32 Bit			N
08.02	2007-03-11	Global Mapper	Global Mapper	32 Bit			N
08.03	2007-04-28	Global Mapper	Global Mapper	32 Bit			N
09.00	2007-08-28	Global Mapper	Global Mapper	32 Bit			N
09.01	2007-11-30	Global Mapper	Global Mapper	32 Bit			N
09.02	2008-02-22	Global Mapper	Global Mapper	32 Bit			N
09.03	2008-04-28	Global Mapper	Global Mapper	32 Bit			N
10.00	2008-08-21	Global Mapper	Global Mapper	32 Bit			N
10.01	2008-11-13	Global Mapper	Global Mapper	32 Bit			N
10.02	2009-01-28	Global Mapper	Global Mapper	32 Bit			N
11.00	2009-08-12	Global Mapper	Global Mapper	32 64 Bit			N
11.01	2009-11-05	Global Mapper	Global Mapper	32 64 Bit			N
11.02	2010-03-01	Global Mapper	Global Mapper	32 64 Bit			N
12.00	2010-09-22	Global Mapper	Global Mapper	32 64 Bit			N
12.01	2011-01-13	Global Mapper	Global Mapper	32 64 Bit			N
12.02	2011-04-15	Global Mapper	Global Mapper	32 64 Bit			N
13.00	2011-09-13	Global Mapper	Global Mapper	32 64 Bit			N
13.01	2012-01-01	Global Mapper	Blue Marble Geographics	32 64 Bit		Y	N
13.02	2012-06-26	Global Mapper	Blue Marble Geographics	32 64 Bit			N
14.00	2012-10-25	Global Mapper	Blue Marble Geographics	32 64 Bit			N
14.01	2013-04-30	Global Mapper	Blue Marble Geographics	32 64 Bit			N
14.02	2013-08-15	Global Mapper	Blue Marble Geographics	32 64 Bit			N
15.00	2013-11-16	Global Mapper	Blue Marble Geographics	32 64 Bit			N
15.01	2014-01-30	Global Mapper	Blue Marble Geographics	32 64 Bit			N
15.02	2014-06-15	Global Mapper	Blue Marble Geographics	32 64 Bit			N
16.00	2014-12-12	Global Mapper	Blue Marble Geographics	32 64 Bit		Y	N
16.01	2015-02-04	Global Mapper	Blue Marble Geographics	32 64 Bit		Y	N
16.02	2015-08-19	Global Mapper	Blue Marble Geographics	32 64 Bit			N
17.00	2015-10-19	Global Mapper	Blue Marble Geographics	32 64 Bit		Y	N
17.01	2016-03-04	Global Mapper	Blue Marble Geographics	32 64 Bit		Y	N
17.02	2016-05-27	Global Mapper	Blue Marble Geographics	32 64 Bit		Y	N
18.00	2016-10-17	Global Mapper	Blue Marble Geographics	32 64 Bit		Y	N
18.01	2017-02-21	Global Mapper	Blue Marble Geographics	32 64 Bit			N
18.02	2017-05-25	Global Mapper	Blue Marble Geographics	32 64 Bit		Y	N
19.00	2017-10-11	Global Mapper	Blue Marble Geographics	32 64 Bit			N
19.01	2018-02-15	Global Mapper	Blue Marble Geographics	32 64 Bit		Y	N
20.00	2018-09-25	Global Mapper	Blue Marble Geographics	32 64 Bit		Y	N
20.01	2019-02-25	Global Mapper	Blue Marble Geographics	32 64 Bit		Y	N
21.00	2019-10-03	Global Mapper	Blue Marble Geographics	32 64 Bit			N
21.01	2020-02-19	Global Mapper	Blue Marble Geographics	32 64 Bit			N
22.00	2020-10-19	Global Mapper	Blue Marble Geographics	32 64 Bit	Y	Y	N
22.01	2021-03-09	Global Mapper	Blue Marble Geographics	32 64 Bit	Y		N
23.00	2021-09-15	Global Mapper	Blue Marble Geographics	64 Bit	Y	Y	N
23.01	2022-02-15	Global Mapper	Blue Marble Geographics	64 Bit	Y	Y	N
24.00	2022-09-20	Global Mapper	Blue Marble Geographics	64 Bit	Y	Y	N
24.01	2023-03-10	Global Mapper	Blue Marble Geographics	64 Bit	Y	Y	N
25.00	2023-09-26	Global Mapper	Blue Marble Geographics	64 Bit	Y	Y	N
25.01	2024-02-20	Global Mapper	Blue Marble Geographics	64 Bit	Y	Y	N
26.00	2024-09-17	Global Mapper	Blue Marble Geographics	64 Bit	Y	Y	N
26.01	2025-02-19	Global Mapper	Blue Marble Geographics	64 Bit	Y	Y	N
26.02	2025-10-07	Global Mapper	Blue Marble Geographics	64 Bit	Y	Y	N
