= Vector Product Format =

Vector Product Format (VPF) is a military standard for vector-based digital map products produced by the U.S. Department of Defense (DOD). It has been adopted as part of the Digital Geographic Exchange Standard (DIGEST) in the form of Vector Relational Format (VRF), so VPF can be considered to be an international standard as well.
