= Digital line graph =

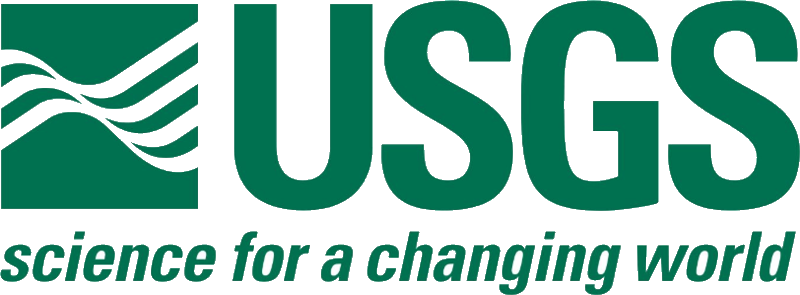
USGS logo

A Digital Line Graph (DLG) is a cartographic map feature represented in digital vector form that is distributed by the U.S. Geological Survey (USGS). DLGs are collected from USGS maps and are distributed in large, intermediate and small scale with up to nine different categories of features, depending on the scale. They come in optional and Spatial Data Transfer Standard (SDTS) format and are topologically structured for use in mapping and geographic information system (GIS) applications.

== Description ==
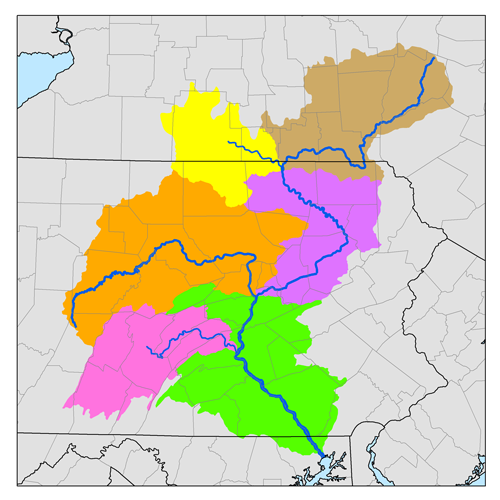
Map produced with DLG data

DLGs are normally derived from USGS maps or USGS map-related sources. DLGs are distributed at three different scales: large-scale, which normally correspond to the USGS 7.5- by 7.5-minute, 1:24,000 and 1:25,000-scale topographic quadrangle map series, 1:63,360-scale for Alaska and 1:30,000-scale for Puerto Rico; intermediate scale, which are derived from the USGS 30- by 60-minute, 1:100,000-scale map series; and small-scale, which are derived from the USGS 1:2,000,000-scale sectional maps of the National Atlas of the United States. Large-scale DLGs are usually cast on the Universal Transverse Mercator coordinate system (UTM), but are sometimes cast on the State Plane rectangular coordinate system. Intermediate-scale DLGs are sold in 30- by 30-minute sections that correspond to the east or west half of the 100K quadrangle map, and each of the 30-minute sections is distributed in four 15- by 15-minute cells and is cast on the UTM coordinate system. Small-scale DLGs are sold in state units and are cast on either the Albers equal-area conic projection system or the geographic coordinate system of latitude and longitude, depending on the distribution format. All DLGs are referenced to the North American Datum of 1927 (NAD27) or the North American Datum of 1983 (NAD83). USGS DLGs are topologically structured for use in mapping and geographic information system (GIS) applications.

== Data categories ==
Nine different categories of features, or layers, are available in DLGs: Public Land Survey System (PLSS), Boundaries (BD), Transportation (TR), Hydrography (HY), Hypsography (HP), Non-vegetative features (NV), Survey control and markers (SM), Man-made features (MS) and Vegetative surface cover (SC). Large-scale DLGs offer all nine layers, while intermediate-scale DLGs offer the five layers of PLSS, BD, TR, HY and HP. Small-scale DLGs offer the five layers of PLSS, BD, TR, HY and MS.

== Distribution formats ==
DLGs are available in two different formats: optional format, a simple-to-use format that incorporates an 80-byte logical record length, the UTM ground coordinate system, and topology linkages contained in line, node and area elements; and Spatial Data Transfer Standard (SDTS) format, a format that facilitates transferring of spatial data between different computer systems.

Large-scale DLGs are available in optional format and will also be available in SDTS format as the data from each state is converted. Intermediate-scale DLGs are available in optional format and the HY and TR layers are also available in SDTS format. Small-scale DLGs are available in both optional and SDTS formats.
