= Spatial Data Transfer Standard =

Spatial Data Transfer Standard, or SDTS, is a standard used to describe earth-referenced spatial data. It was designed to easily transfer and use spatial data on different computer platforms. The FGDC has proposed to withdraw the standard.

The USGS made an effort to promulgate the standard by making a large volume of data available at no cost and many companies supported the standard by writing translators to transform the data into different formats.
