= Daniel R. Montello =

American geographer and professor

- Born: 1959 (age 66–67)
- Citizenship: American
- Occupations: Geographer and psychologist

Daniel R. Montello (born 1959) is an American geographer and psychologist. He is emeritus professor at the Department of Geography of the University of California Santa Barbara, and emeritus affiliate at its Department of Psychological & Brain Sciences. He specializes in behavioral-cognitive geography and environmental psychology, and is known for his work on spatial, environmental, and geographic perception, cognition, affect, and behavior, including cognitive issues in cartography and GIScience.

== Biography ==
Montello obtained his BA in psychology at the Johns Hopkins University in 1981, and in 1986 his MA in psychology at the Arizona State University, where in 1988 he also obtained his PhD in psychology with a thesis in the area of environmental psychology.

Montello started his academic career as postdoctoral fellow at University of Minnesota in the Institute of Child Development. He was a visiting professor of Psychology at North Dakota State University in 1991–92. In 1992, he moved to the University of California, Santa Barbara (UCSB), where he started as assistant professor in the Department of Geography. In 1996 he was appointed associate professor, and since 2002, he was professor. Starting in 1995, he was also affiliated with UCSB’s Department of Psychological & Brain Sciences. In 2025, he became emeritus distinguished professor at UCSB.

Montello is member of the Association of American Geographers, the Psychonomics Society, and the Sigma Xi Scientific Honor Society. He serves on the editorial boards of several academic journals and has served as ad-hoc reviewer for over 100 research and academic journals. Along with Anthony Cohn, Montello is Co-Editor of Spatial Cognition and Computation.

== Selected publications ==
=== Selected books ===
- Curtin, Kevin M.; Montello, Daniel R., eds. (2023). Collective spatial cognition. Abingdon, Oxon ; New York, NY: Routledge. ISBN 978-1-032-06542-7.
- Montello, Daniel R.; Applegarth, Michael T.; McKnight, Tom L. (2021-03-29). Regional Geography of the United States and Canada: Fifth Edition. Waveland Press. ISBN 978-1-4786-4712-6.
- Montello, Daniel R., ed. (2018). Handbook of behavioral and cognitive geography. Cheltenham, UK ; Northampton, Massachusetts: EE Edward Elgar Publishing. ISBN 978-1-78471-753-7.
- Montello, Daniel R.; Grossner, Karl; Janelle, Donald G., eds. (2014). Space in mind: concepts for spatial learning and education. London, England: MIT Press. ISBN 978-0-262-02829-5.
- Montello, Daniel; Sutton, Paul (2013). An Introduction to Scientific Research Methods in Geography (2nd ed.). 2455 Teller Road, Thousand Oaks California 91320 United States: SAGE Publications, Inc. doi:10.4135/9781452225814. ISBN 978-1-4129-0287-8.

=== Selected published articles ===
- Montello, Daniel R. (1993), Scale and multiple psychologies of space, Lecture Notes in Computer Science, vol. 716, Berlin, Heidelberg: Springer Berlin Heidelberg, pp. 312–321, doi:10.1007/3-540-57207-4_21, ISBN 978-3-540-57207-7
- Hegarty, M; Richardson, Anthony E.; Montello, Daniel R.; Lovelace, Kristin; Subbiah, Ilavanil (2002). "Development of a self-report measure of environmental spatial ability". Intelligence. 30 (5): 425–447. doi:10.1016/s0160-2896(02)00116-2. ISSN 0160-2896.
- Montello, Daniel R. (2005-07-18), "Navigation", The Cambridge Handbook of Visuospatial Thinking, Cambridge University Press, pp. 257–294, doi:10.1017/cbo9780511610448.008, ISBN 978-0-511-61044-8
- Ishikawa, T; Montello, D (2006). "Spatial knowledge acquisition from direct experience in the environment: Individual differences in the development of metric knowledge and the integration of separately learned places☆". Cognitive Psychology. 52 (2): 93–129. doi:10.1016/j.cogpsych.2005.08.003. ISSN 0010-0285. PMID 16375882.
- Montello, Daniel R.; Raubal, Martin (2012), "Functions and applications of spatial cognition.", Handbook of spatial cognition., Washington: American Psychological Association, pp. 249–264, doi:10.1037/13936-014, ISBN 978-1-4338-1204-0
- Montello, Daniel R.; Friedman, Alinda; Phillips, Daniel W. (2014-04-04). "Vague cognitive regions in geography and geographic information science". International Journal of Geographical Information Science. 28 (9): 1802–1820. Bibcode:2014IJGIS..28.1802M. doi:10.1080/13658816.2014.900178. ISSN 1365-8816.
- Dalton, Ruth C.; Hölscher, Christoph; Montello, Daniel R. (2019). "Wayfinding as a Social Activity". Frontiers in Psychology. 10 142. doi:10.3389/fpsyg.2019.00142. ISSN 1664-1078. PMC 6369211. PMID 30778315.
- Montello, Daniel R.; Battersby, Sarah E. (2021-08-02). "Another Look at the "Mercator Effect" on Global-Scale Cognitive Maps: Not in Areas but in Directions". Annals of the American Association of Geographers. 112 (2): 468–486. doi:10.1080/24694452.2021.1931001. ISSN 2469-4452.
- Götz, Friedrich M.; Montello, Daniel R.; Varnum, Michael E. W.; Luca, Davide; Kenrick, Douglas T. (2025-07-03). "A unified framework integrating psychology and geography". Nature Human Behaviour. 9 (9): 1780–1792. doi:10.1038/s41562-025-02237-y. ISSN 2397-3374. PMID 40610732.
