= Sliver polygon =

Type of error in vector GIS

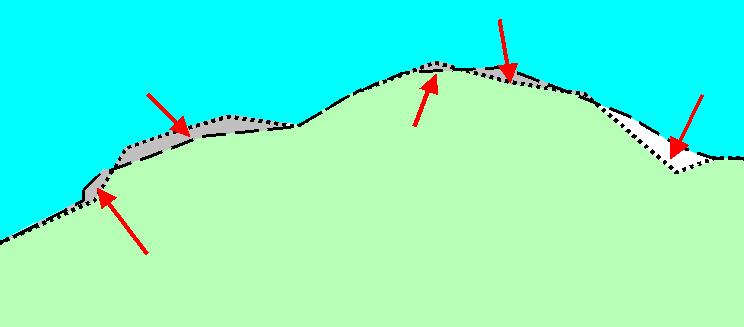
Examples of sliver polygons

A sliver polygon, in the context of Geographic Information Systems (GIS), is a small polygon found in vector data that is an artifact of error rather than representing a real-world feature. They have been a recognized source of error since overlay was first invented in the 1970s.

== History ==
These meaningless polygons were recognized early in the development of GIS. In fact, in 1978 Michael Goodchild found that they constituted the majority of all polygons in some operational GIS. Early programs for performing vector overlay, such as WHIRLPOOL, developed mechanisms for preventing sliver polygons, such as the "epsilon filter" (fuzzy tolerance) In recent decades, most of the focus of software vendors and practitioners has been on improving the quality of GIS data to prevent them.

== Cause, Prevention, Repair ==
Sliver polygons are typically created when polygons are automatically generated from lines that should be coincident (e.g., an international boundary following a river de jure, or two adjacent counties) but are not, due to the natural discrepancies that arise from manual or automated digitization. This can occur when a single layer is digitized and adjacent polygons are traced separately, or during vector overlay when separate polygon layers are merged.

They can be prevented during the digitization process by ensuring that lines that are supposed to be coincident actually are coincident. The editing systems in most GIS software provides for snapping, in which a point placed near an existing point "snaps" to the exact same coordinate. The user can usually control the process, such as setting a snap tolerance (the maximum distance to consider "close enough"), and which layers and which parts of those layers to snap to. In addition, many systems have tracing tools, so that newly digitized lines can exactly follow existing lines.

During the overlay process, the preferred mode of sliver polygon prevention is the use of a fuzzy tolerance, which is sometimes called a "xy tolerance" (ArcGIS) or "snapping threshold" (GRASS), and was originally called an "epsilon filter." The user provides a tolerance distance, and as the lines of the input layers are being combined topologically, any lines that are roughly parallel, consistently closer together than the fuzzy tolerance, are combined into a single line. The choice of a proper fuzzy tolerance depends on the situation, especially the scale of the data, and can be a challenge. If it is set too large, narrow but meaningful polygons (e.g., islands in a river) can be collapsed.

If sliver polygons still exist in a data set, they may be removed manually or automatically. Some GIS systems provide a tool for topological verification, which searches for topological errors in a data set (sliver polygons being one among many potential types of error), flagging them for correction. One option is to attempt to remove them automatically; many GIS systems provide a tool (usually called Eliminate) that finds very small polygons and merges them into one of the adjacent polygons. There is usually a parameter to pre-select, in situations where there is more than one adjacent polygon, either the largest adjacent polygon or the one with the longest common boundary.
