= Region connection calculus =

The region connection calculus (RCC) is intended to serve for qualitative spatial representation and reasoning. RCC abstractly describes regions (in Euclidean space, or in a topological space) by their possible relations to each other. RCC8 consists of 8 basic relations that are possible between two regions:

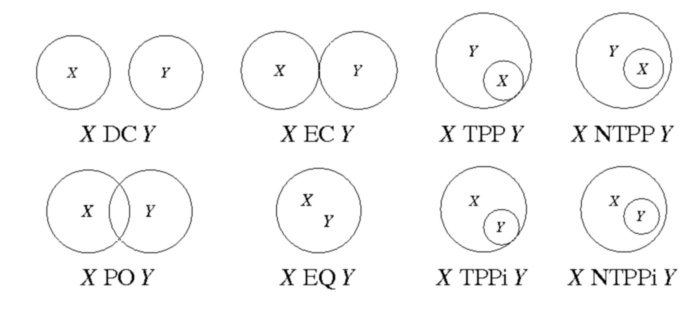
The eight basic relations of the RCC8 calculus.

- disconnected (DC)
- externally connected (EC)
- equal (EQ)
- partially overlapping (PO)
- tangential proper part (TPP)
- tangential proper part inverse (TPPi)
- non-tangential proper part (NTPP)
- non-tangential proper part inverse (NTPPi)

From these basic relations, combinations can be built. For example, proper part (PP) is the union of TPP and NTPP.

== Axioms ==
RCC is governed by two axioms.

- for any region x, x connects with itself
- for any region x, y, if x connects with y, y connects with x

== Remark on the axioms ==
The two axioms describe two features of the connection relation, but not the characteristic feature of the connect relation. For example, we can say that an object is less than 10 meters away from itself and that if object A is less than 10 meters away from object B, object B will be less than 10 meters away from object A. So, the relation 'less-than-10-meters' also satisfies the above two axioms, but does not talk about the connection relation in the intended sense of RCC.

== Composition table ==
The composition table of RCC8 are as follows:

R_{2}(b, c) R_{1}(a, b)	DC	EC	PO	TPP	NTPP	TPPi	NTPPi	EQ
DC	*	DC, EC, PO, TPP, NTPP	DC, EC, PO, TPP, NTPP	DC, EC, PO, TPP, NTPP	DC, EC, PO, TPP, NTPP	DC	DC	DC
EC	DC, EC, PO, TPPi, NTPPi	DC, EC, PO, TPP, TPPi, EQ	DC, EC, PO, TPP, NTPP	EC, PO, TPP, NTPP	PO, TPP, NTPP	DC, EC	DC	EC
PO	DC, EC, PO, TPPi, NTPPi	DC, EC, PO, TPPi, NTPPi	*	PO, TPP, NTPP	PO, TPP, NTPP	DC, EC, PO, TPPi, NTPPi	DC, EC, PO, TPPi, NTPPi	PO
TPP	DC	DC, EC	DC, EC, PO, TPP, NTPP	TPP, NTPP	NTPP	DC, EC, PO, TPP, TPPi, EQ	DC, EC, PO, TPPi, NTPPi	TPP
NTPP	DC	DC	DC, EC, PO, TPP, NTPP	NTPP	NTPP	DC, EC, PO, TPP, NTPP	*	NTPP
TPPi	DC, EC, PO, TPPi, NTPPi	EC, PO, TPPi, NTPPi	PO, TPPi, NTPPi	PO, TPP, TPPi, EQ	PO, TPP, NTPP	TPPi, NTPPi	NTPPi	TPPi
NTPPi	DC, EC, PO, TPPi, NTPPi	PO, TPPi, NTPPi	PO, TPPi, NTPPi	PO, TPPi, NTPPi	PO, TPP, NTPP, TPPi, NTPPi, EQ	NTPPi	NTPPi	NTPPi
EQ	DC	EC	PO	TPP	NTPP	TPPi	NTPPi	EQ

- "*" denotes the universal relation, no relation can be discarded.

Usage example: if a TPP b and b EC c, (row 4, column 2) of the table says that a DC c or a EC c.

== Examples ==
The RCC8 calculus is intended for reasoning about spatial configurations. Consider the following example: two houses are connected via a road. Each house is located on an own property. The first house possibly touches the boundary of the property; the second one surely does not. What can we infer about the relation of the second property to the road?

The spatial configuration can be formalized in RCC8 as the following constraint network:

house1 DC house2
house1 {TPP, NTPP} property1
house1 {DC, EC} property2
house1 EC road
house2 { DC, EC } property1
house2 NTPP property2
house2 EC road
property1 { DC, EC } property2
road { DC, EC, TPP, TPPi, PO, EQ, NTPP, NTPPi } property1
road { DC, EC, TPP, TPPi, PO, EQ, NTPP, NTPPi } property2

Using the RCC8 composition table and the path-consistency algorithm, we can refine the network in the following way:

road { PO, EC } property1
road { PO, TPP } property2

That is, the road either overlaps (PO) property2, or is a tangential proper part of it. But, if the road is a tangential proper part of property2, then the road can only be externally connected (EC) to property1. That is, road PO property1 is not possible when road TPP property2. This fact is not obvious, but can be deduced once we examine the consistent "singleton-labelings" of the constraint network. The following paragraph briefly describes singleton-labelings.

First, we note that the path-consistency algorithm will also reduce the possible properties between house2 and property1 from { DC, EC } to just DC. So, the path-consistency algorithm leaves multiple possible constraints on 5 of the edges in the constraint network. Since each of the multiple constraints involves 2 constraints, we can reduce the network to 32 (2^{5}) possible unique constraint networks, each containing only single labels on each edge ("singleton labelings"). However, of the 32 possible singleton labelings, only 9 are consistent. (See qualreas for details.) Only one of the consistent singleton labelings has the edge road TPP property2 and the same labeling includes road EC property1.

Other versions of the region connection calculus include RCC5 (with only five basic relations - the distinction whether two regions touch each other are ignored) and RCC23 (which allows reasoning about convexity).

== RCC8 use in GeoSPARQL ==
RCC8 has been partially implemented in GeoSPARQL as described below:

A graphical representation of Region Connection Calculus (RCC: Randell, Cui and Cohn, 1992) and the links to the equivalent naming by the Open Geospatial Consortium (OGC) with their equivalent URIs.

== Implementations ==
- GQR is a reasoner for RCC-5, RCC-8, and RCC-23 (as well as other calculi for spatial and temporal reasoning)
- qualreas is a Python framework for qualitative reasoning over networks of relation algebras, such as RCC-8, Allen's interval algebra and more.

== See also ==
- Spatial relation
  - DE-9IM

== Bibliography ==
- Randell, D.A.; Cui, Z; Cohn, A.G. (1992). "A spatial logic based on regions and connection". 3rd Int. Conf. on Knowledge Representation and Reasoning. Morgan Kaufmann. pp. 165–176.
- Anthony G. Cohn; Brandon Bennett; John Gooday; Micholas Mark Gotts (1997). "Qualitative Spatial Representation and Reasoning with the Region Connection Calculus". GeoInformatica. 1 (3): 275–316. Bibcode:1997GInfo...1..275C. doi:10.1023/A:1009712514511. S2CID 14841370..
- Renz, J. (2002). Qualitative Spatial Reasoning with Topological Information. Lecture Notes in Computer Science. Vol. 2293. Springer Verlag. doi:10.1007/3-540-70736-0. ISBN 978-3-540-43346-0. S2CID 8236425.
- Dong, Tiansi (2008). "A Comment on RCC: From RCC to RCC⁺⁺". Journal of Philosophical Logic. 34 (2): 319–352. doi:10.1007/s10992-007-9074-y. JSTOR 41217909. S2CID 6243376..
