= Well-known text representation of geometry =

Computer markup language

Well-known text (WKT) is a text markup language for representing vector geometry objects. A binary equivalent, known as well-known binary (WKB), is used to transfer and store the same information in a more compact form convenient for computer processing but that is not human-readable. The formats were originally defined by the Open Geospatial Consortium (OGC) and described in their Simple Feature Access. The current standard definition is in the ISO/IEC 13249-3:2016 standard.

== Geometric objects ==
WKT can represent the following distinct geometric objects:

- Point, MultiPoint
- LineString, MultiLineString
- Polygon, MultiPolygon, Triangle
- PolyhedralSurface
- TIN (Triangulated irregular network)
- GeometryCollection

Coordinates for geometries may be 2D (x, y), 3D (x, y, z), 4D (x, y, z, m) with an m value that is part of a linear referencing system or 2D with an m value (x, y, m). Three-dimensional geometries are designated by a "Z" after the geometry type and geometries with a linear referencing system have an "M" after the geometry type. Empty geometries that contain no coordinates can be specified by using the symbol EMPTY after the type name.

WKT geometries are used throughout OGC specifications and are present in applications that implement these specifications. For example, PostGIS contains functions that can convert geometries to and from a WKT representation, making them human readable.

The OGC standard definition requires a polygon to be topologically closed. It also states that if the exterior linear ring of a polygon is defined in a counterclockwise direction, then it will be seen from the "top". Any interior linear rings should be defined in opposite fashion compared to the exterior ring, in this case, clockwise.

Geometry primitives (2D)
Type	Examples
Point	POINT (30 10)
LineString	LINESTRING (30 10, 10 30, 40 40)
Polygon	POLYGON ((30 10, 40 40, 20 40, 10 20, 30 10))
Polygon	POLYGON ((35 10, 45 45, 15 40, 10 20, 35 10), (20 30, 35 35, 30 20, 20 30))

Multipart geometries (2D)
Type	Examples
MultiPoint	MULTIPOINT ((10 40), (40 30), (20 20), (30 10))
MultiPoint	MULTIPOINT (10 40, 40 30, 20 20, 30 10)
MultiLineString	MULTILINESTRING ((10 10, 20 20, 10 40), (40 40, 30 30, 40 20, 30 10))
MultiPolygon	MULTIPOLYGON (((30 20, 45 40, 10 40, 30 20)), ((15 5, 40 10, 10 20, 5 10, 15 5)))
MultiPolygon	MULTIPOLYGON (((40 40, 20 45, 45 30, 40 40)), ((20 35, 10 30, 10 10, 30 5, 45 20, 20 35), (30 20, 20 15, 20 25, 30 20)))
GeometryCollection	GEOMETRYCOLLECTION (POINT (40 10), LINESTRING (10 10, 20 20, 10 40), POLYGON ((40 40, 20 45, 45 30, 40 40)))

The following are some other examples of geometric WKT strings: (Note: Each item below is an individual geometry.)

GEOMETRYCOLLECTION(POINT(4 6),LINESTRING(4 6,7 10))
POINT ZM (1 1 5 60)
POINT M (1 1 80)
POINT EMPTY
MULTIPOLYGON EMPTY
TRIANGLE((0 0 0,0 1 0,1 1 0,0 0 0))
TIN (((0 0 0, 0 0 1, 0 1 0, 0 0 0)), ((0 0 0, 0 1 0, 1 1 0, 0 0 0)))
POLYHEDRALSURFACE Z ( PATCHES
    ((0 0 0, 0 1 0, 1 1 0, 1 0 0, 0 0 0)),
    ((0 0 0, 0 1 0, 0 1 1, 0 0 1, 0 0 0)),
    ((0 0 0, 1 0 0, 1 0 1, 0 0 1, 0 0 0)),
    ((1 1 1, 1 0 1, 0 0 1, 0 1 1, 1 1 1)),
    ((1 1 1, 1 0 1, 1 0 0, 1 1 0, 1 1 1)),
    ((1 1 1, 1 1 0, 0 1 0, 0 1 1, 1 1 1))
  )

== Well-known binary ==
Well-known binary (WKB) representations are typically shown in hexadecimal strings.

The first byte indicates the byte order for the data:

- 0x00 : big endian
- 0x01 : little endian

The next 4 bytes are a 32-bit unsigned integer for the geometry type, as described below:

Geometry types, and WKB integer codes (specified below in decimal)
Type	2D	Z	M	ZM
Geometry	0	1000	2000	3000
Point	1	1001	2001	3001
LineString	2	1002	2002	3002
Polygon	3	1003	2003	3003
MultiPoint	4	1004	2004	3004
MultiLineString	5	1005	2005	3005
MultiPolygon	6	1006	2006	3006
GeometryCollection	7	1007	2007	3007
CircularString	8	1008	2008	3008
CompoundCurve	9	1009	2009	3009
CurvePolygon	10	1010	2010	3010
MultiCurve	11	1011	2011	3011
MultiSurface	12	1012	2012	3012
Curve	13	1013	2013	3013
Surface	14	1014	2014	3014
PolyhedralSurface	15	1015	2015	3015
TIN	16	1016	2016	3016
Triangle	17	1017	2017	3017
Circle	18	1018	2018	3018
GeodesicString	19	1019	2019	3019
EllipticalCurve	20	1020	2020	3020
NurbsCurve	21	1021	2021	3021
Clothoid	22	1022	2022	3022
SpiralCurve	23	1023	2023	3023
CompoundSurface	24	1024	2024	3024
BrepSolid		1025		
AffinePlacement	102	1102		

Each data type has a unique data structure, such as the number of points or linear rings, followed by coordinates in 64-bit double numbers.

For example, the geometry POINT(2.0 4.0) is represented as: 000000000140000000000000004010000000000000, where:

- 1-byte integer 00 or 0: big endian
- 4-byte integer 00000001 or 1: POINT (2D)
- 8-byte float 4000000000000000 or 2.0: x-coordinate
- 8-byte float 4010000000000000 or 4.0: y-coordinate

== Format variations ==
EWKT and EWKB – Extended Well-Known Text/Binary
A PostGIS-specific format that includes the spatial reference system identifier (SRID) and up to 4 ordinate values (XYZM). For example: SRID=4326;POINT(-44.3 60.1) to locate a longitude/latitude coordinate using the WGS 84 reference coordinate system. It also supports circular curves, following elements named (but not fully defined) within the original WKT: CircularString, CompoundCurve, CurvePolygon and CompoundSurface.
AGF Text – Autodesk Geometry Format
An extension to OGC's Standard (at the time), to include curved elements; most notably used in MapGuide.

== See also ==
- Simple Features
- Geography Markup Language
- Well-known text representation of coordinate reference systems
