= Qualitative reasoning =

Area of research in Artificial Intelligence

Qualitative Reasoning (QR) is an area of research within Artificial Intelligence (AI) that automates reasoning about continuous aspects of the physical world, such as space, time, and quantity, for the purpose of problem solving and planning using qualitative rather than quantitative information. Precise numerical values or quantities are avoided, and qualitative values are used instead (e.g., high, low, zero, rising, falling, etc.).

== Purpose ==
Qualitative reasoning creates non-numerical descriptions of physical systems and their behavior, preserving important behavioral properties and qualitative distinctions. The goal of qualitative reasoning research is to develop representation and reasoning methods that enable computer programs to reason about the behavior of physical systems, without precise quantitative information. An example is observing pouring rain and the steadily rising water level of a river, which is sufficient information to take action against possible flooding without knowing the exact water level, the rate of change, or the time the river might flood.

== Principles ==
The principles used are motivated by human cognition.

The principles of qualitative reasoning include:

- Discrete values
  - Represent continuous quantities using discrete entities for reasoning
  - Example: Instead of using a numerical value for rate of change, consider whether it is increasing, decreasing or constant
- Relevant values
  - Choose qualitative values based on relevance to a task
  - Example: If the temperature is changing, the boiling point may be important, but if the temperature is constant, the boiling point may be irrelevant
- Ambiguous values or results
  - Instead of providing one answer, provide a range of answers
  - Example: Instead of computing a numeric level or quantity of water, provide two answers: low or zero
- Modeling a process
  - Represent the states
  - Represent the transitions between states
  - For quantities, determine landmarks and use inequality reasoning
  - Example:
    If the temperature of water is below the boiling point, then the water level is constant or slowly decreasing;
    if the temperature of water is above the boiling point, then the water level is rapidly decreasing;
    if water has a temperature that changes from below the boiling point to above the boiling point, then the water level will change to rapidly decreasing;
    if water is above the boiling point for a specified length of time, the water level will be low or zero

== Uses ==
The techniques which have been developed for qualitative reasoning permit the simulation of quantitative systems which are subject to multiple constraints in the form of inequalities as well as equalities. It can permit the simulation of certain important systems, such as ecosystems, which might otherwise be too complex to model. Qualitative reasoning provides a method for modeling with quantitative inequalities in addition to qualities.

Successful application areas include process control, system verification, explanation, autonomous spacecraft support, simulation and explanation of the behavior of structures, failure analysis and on-board diagnosis of vehicle systems, automated generation of control software for photocopiers, conceptual knowledge capture in ecology, and intelligent aids for human learning.

== See also ==
- Spatial-temporal reasoning
