= Spatial–temporal reasoning =

Area of artificial intelligence

Spatial–temporal reasoning is an area of artificial intelligence that draws from the fields of computer science, cognitive science, and cognitive psychology. The theoretic goal—on the cognitive side—involves representing and reasoning spatial-temporal knowledge in mind. The applied goal—on the computing side—involves developing high-level control systems of automata for navigating and understanding time and space.

== Influence from cognitive psychology ==
A convergent result in cognitive psychology is that the connection relation is the first spatial relation that human babies acquire, followed by understanding orientation relations and distance relations. Internal relations among the three kinds of spatial relations can be computationally and systematically explained within the theory of cognitive prism as follows:

1. the connection relation is primitive;
2. an orientation relation is a distance comparison relation: you being in front of me can be interpreted as you are nearer to my front side than my other sides;
3. a distance relation is a connection relation using a third object: you being one meter away from me can be interpreted as a one-meter-long object connected with you and me simultaneously.

== Fragmentary representations of temporal calculi ==
Without addressing internal relations among spatial relations, AI researchers contributed many fragmentary representations. Examples of temporal calculi include Allen's interval algebra, and Vilain's & Kautz's point algebra. The most prominent spatial calculi are mereotopological calculi, Frank's cardinal direction calculus, Freksa's double cross calculus, Egenhofer and Franzosa's 4- and 9-intersection calculi, Ligozat's flip-flop calculus, various region connection calculi (RCC), and the Oriented Point Relation Algebra.

Recently, spatio-temporal calculi have been designed that combine spatial and temporal information. For example, the spatiotemporal constraint calculus (STCC) by Gerevini and Nebel combines Allen's interval algebra with RCC-8. Moreover, the qualitative trajectory calculus (QTC) allows for reasoning about moving objects.

== Quantitative abstraction ==
An emphasis in the literature has been on qualitative spatial-temporal reasoning which is based on qualitative abstractions of temporal and spatial aspects of the common-sense background knowledge on which our human perspective of physical reality is based. Methodologically, qualitative constraint calculi restrict the vocabulary of rich mathematical theories dealing with temporal or spatial entities such that specific aspects of these theories can be treated within decidable fragments with simple qualitative (non-metric) languages.

Contrary to mathematical or physical theories about space and time, qualitative constraint calculi allow for rather inexpensive reasoning about entities located in space and time. For this reason, the limited expressiveness of qualitative representation formalism calculi is a benefit if such reasoning tasks need to be integrated in applications. For example, some of these calculi may be implemented for handling spatial GIS queries efficiently and some may be used for navigating, and communicating with, a mobile robot.

== Relation algebra ==
Most of these calculi can be formalized as abstract relation algebras, such that reasoning can be carried out at a symbolic level. For computing solutions of a constraint network, the path-consistency algorithm is an important tool.

== Software ==
- GQR, constraint network solver for calculi like RCC-5, RCC-8, Allen's interval algebra, point algebra, cardinal direction calculus, etc.
- qualreas is a Python framework for qualitative reasoning over networks of relation algebras, such as RCC-8, Allen's interval algebra, and Allen's algebra integrated with Time Points and situated in either Left- or Right-Branching Time.

== See also ==
- Cerebral cortex
- Commonsense reasoning
- Diagrammatic reasoning
- Spatial ability
- Temporal logic
- Visual thinking
