= Spatial relation =

Relative location of objects in space

A spatial relation specifies how some object is located in space in relation to some reference object. When the reference object is much bigger than the object to locate, the latter is often represented by a point. The reference object is often represented by a bounding box.

In Anatomy it might be the case that a spatial relation is not fully applicable. Thus, the degree of applicability is defined which specifies from 0 till 100% how strongly a spatial relation holds. Often researchers concentrate on defining the applicability function for various spatial relations.

In spatial databases and geospatial topology the spatial relations are used for spatial analysis and constraint specifications.

In cognitive development for walk and for catch objects, or for understand objects-behaviour; in robotic Natural Features Navigation; and many other areas, spatial relations plays a central role.

Commonly used types of spatial relations are: topological, directional and distance relations.

== Topological relations ==
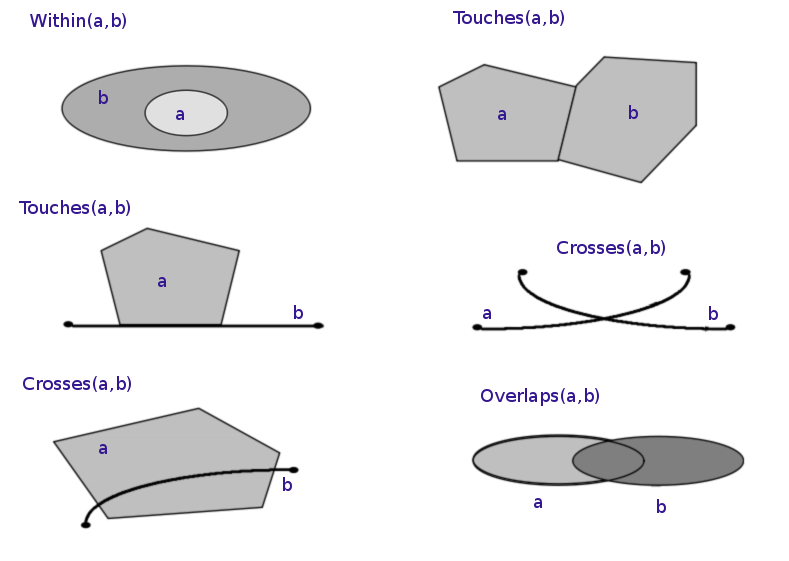
Examples of topological spatial relations.

The DE-9IM model expresses important space relations which are invariant to rotation, translation and scaling transformations.

For any two spatial objects a and b, that can be points, lines and/or polygonal areas, there are 9 relations derived from DE-9IM:

The 11 exhaustive logical relations between two regions. These diagrams provide a visual counterpart to the topological models like DE-9IM, illustrating the variety of ways two spatial objects can relate.

Equals
a = b
Topologically equal. Also (a ∩ b = a) ∧ (a ∩ b = b)
Disjoint
a ∩ b = ∅
a and b are disjoint, have no point in common. They form a set of disconnected geometries.
Intersects
a ∩ b ≠ ∅
Touches
(a ∩ b ≠ ∅) ∧ (a^{ο} ∩ b^{ο} = ∅)
a touches b, they have at least one boundary point in common, but no interior points.
Contains
a ∩ b = b
Covers
a^{ο} ∩ b = b
b lies in the interior of a (extends Contains). Other definitions: "no points of b lie in the exterior of a", or "Every point of b is a point of (the interior of) a".
CoveredBy
Covers(b,a)
Within
a ∩ b = a

== Directional relations ==
Directional relations can again be differentiated into external directional relations and internal directional relations. An internal directional relation specifies where an object is located inside the reference object while an external relations specifies where the object is located outside of the reference objects.

- Examples for internal directional relations: left; on the back; athwart, abaft
- Examples for external directional relations: on the right of; behind; in front of, abeam, astern

== Distance relations ==
Distance relations specify how far is the object away from the reference object.

- Examples are: at; nearby; in the vicinity; far away

== Relations by class ==
Reference objects represented by a bounding box or another kind of "spatial envelope" that encloses its borders, can be denoted with the maximum number of dimensions of this envelope: '0' for punctual objects, '1' for linear objects, '2' for planar objects, '3' for volumetric objects. So, any object, in a 2D modeling, can by classified as point, line or area according to its delimitation. Then, a type of spatial relation can be expressed by the class of the objects that participate in the relation:

- point-point relations: ...
- point-line relations:
- point-area relations:
- line-line relations:
- line-area relations:
- area-area relations:

More complex modeling schemas can represent an object as a composition of simple sub-objects. Examples: represent in an astronomical map a star by a point and a binary star by two points; represent in geographical map a river with a line, for its source stream, and with an strip-area, for the rest of the river. These schemas can use the above classes, uniform composition classes (multi-point, multi-line and multi-area) and heterogeneous composition (points+lines as "object of dimension 1", points+lines+areas as "object of dimension 2").

Two internal components of a complex object can express (the above) binary relations between them, and ternary relations, using the whole object as a frame of reference. Some relations can be expressed by an abstract component, such the center of mass of the binary star, or a center line of the river.

== Temporal references ==
For human thinking, spatial relations include qualities like size, distance, volume, order, and, also, time:

Time is spatial: it requires understanding ordered sequences such as days of the week, months of the year, and seasons. A person with spatial difficulties may have problems understanding “yesterday,” “last week,” and “next month”. Time expressed digitally is just as spatial as time expressed by moving clock hands, but digital clocks remove the need to translate the hand position into numbers.

— Stockdale and Possin

Stockdale and Possin discusses the many ways in which people with difficulty establishing spatial and temporal relationships can face problems in ordinary situations.

== See also ==
- Anatomical terms of location
- Dimensionally Extended nine-Intersection Model (DE-9IM)
- Water-level task
- Allen's interval algebra (temporal analog)
- Commonsense reasoning
