= 1988 Pulitzer Prize =

Awards for journalism and related fields

The following are the Pulitzer Prizes for 1988.

== Journalism ==
Public service	The Charlotte Observer	"For revealing misuse of funds by the PTL television ministry"
General news reporting	Staff of Lawrence Eagle-Tribune, Massachusetts	"For an investigation that revealed serious flaws in the Massachusetts prison furlough system and led to significant statewide reforms."
Investigative reporting	Staff of Alabama Journal, Montgomery, Alabama	"For its compelling investigation of the state's unusually high infant-mortality rate, which prompted legislation to combat the problem."
Investigative reporting	Dean Baquet, William Gaines and Ann Marie Lipinski of the Chicago Tribune	"For their detailed reporting on the self-interest and waste that plague Chicago's City Council."
Explanatory reporting	Daniel Hertzberg and James B. Stewart of The Wall Street Journal	"For their stories about an investment banker charged with insider trading and the critical day that followed the October 19, 1987, stock market crash."
Specialized Reporting	Walt Bogdanich of The Wall Street Journal	"For his chilling series of reports on faulty testing by American medical laboratories."
National reporting	Tim Weiner of The Philadelphia Inquirer	"For his series of reports on a secret Pentagon budget used by the government to sponsor defense research and an arms buildup."
International reporting	Thomas L. Friedman of The New York Times	"For balanced and informed coverage of Israel."
Feature writing	Jacqui Banaszynski of St. Paul Pioneer Press and Dispatch	"For her moving series about the life and death of an AIDS victim in a rural farm community."
Commentary	Dave Barry of The Miami Herald	"For his consistently effective use of humor as a device for presenting fresh insights into serious concerns."
Criticism	Tom Shales of The Washington Post	"For his television criticism."
Editorial writing	Jane Healy of Orlando Sentinel	"For her series of editorials protesting overdevelopment of Florida's Orange County."
Editorial cartooning	Doug Marlette of Atlanta Constitution and The Charlotte Observer	
Spot news photography	Scott Shaw of Odessa American	"For his photograph of the child Jessica McClure being rescued from the well into which she had fallen."
Feature photography	Michel du Cille of The Miami Herald	"For photographs portraying the decay and subsequent rehabilitation of a housing project overrun by the drug crack."

== Letters and Drama ==
Fiction	Beloved by Toni Morrison (Alfred A. Knopf)
Drama	Driving Miss Daisy by Alfred Uhry (TCG)
History	The Launching of Modern American Science 1846-1876 by Robert V. Bruce (Alfred A. Knopf)
Biography or Autobiography	Look Homeward: A Life of Thomas Wolfe by David Herbert Donald (Little)
Poetry	Partial Accounts: New and Selected Poems by William Meredith (Alfred A. Knopf)
General Nonfiction	The Making of the Atomic Bomb by Richard Rhodes (Simon & Schuster)
Music	12 New Etudes for Piano by William Bolcom (Edward B. Marks); Premiered March 30, 1987, by Marc-Andre Hamelin.
