= List of books about Thomas Wolfe =

This list of books about Thomas Wolfe (1900 – 1938) includes biographies, literary criticism, and like books. Wolfe is widely considered to be a major American novelist and short story writer of the early 20th century, and some critics consider some of his work to be worthy of inclusion in the American literary canon.

Year	Title	Author	Publisher	Ref #
1955	Thomas Wolfe: the Weather of his Youth	Louis D. Rubin	Louisiana State University Press	OCLC: 290949
1960	Thomas Wolfe: a Biography	Elizabeth Nowell	Doubleday	ISBN 978-1199861979
1964	Thomas Wolfe	Bruce R. McElderry	Twayne	ISBN 978-0805708332
1967	Thomas Wolfe: a Biography	Andrew Turnbull	Scribner	ISBN 978-0370004679
1969	Thomas Wolfe	Ladell Payne	Steck-Vaughn	OCLC: 283728
1983	My Other Loneliness: Letters of Thomas Wolfe and Aline Bernstein	Suzanne Stutman (editor)	University of North Carolina Press	ISBN 978-0807841174
1984	Thomas Wolfe	Elizabeth Evans	Ungar	OCLC: 566216706
1987	A Thomas Wolfe Companion	John L. Idol	Greenwood	ISBN 978-0313238291
1987	Thomas Wolfe	Harold Bloom	Chelsea House	ISBN 978-0877546382
1988	Look Homeward: A Life of Thomas Wolfe	David Herbert Donald	Little, Brown	ISBN 978-0316189521
2001	Thomas Wolfe	John L. Idol	Gale	OCLC: 1420739546
2001	Thomas Wolfe: An Illustrated Biography	Ted Mitchell (editor)	Pegasus Books	ISBN 978-1933648101
2017	Thomas Wolfe: a Writer's Life	Ted Mitchell	Appalachian State University	ISBN 978-1469638102
2018	Thomas Wolfe Remembered	Mark Canada & Nami Montgomery (editors)	Thomas Wolfe Society	ISBN 978-0817319908
2020	Look Abroad, Angel: Thomas Wolfe and the Geographies of Longing	Jedidiah Evans	University of Georgia Press	ISBN 978-0820356457

Special editions

- Selected Essays From the Thomas Wolfe Newsletter/Review: A Memorial to Dr. John S. Phillipson, Editor 1977-1996. John L. Idol & Deborah A. Borland, editors (1999). Thomas Wolfe Society – limited edition of 600 copies
