= Rozmiarek =

Origin
- Meaning: "surveyor"

Rozmiarek is a surname deriving from Polish meaning surveyor, or one who measures. It is a derivation of the Polish word rozmiar, that has a modern meaning of size, dimension, scale, gauge, gage, extent. In Poland, the Rozmiarek surname is found most commonly in the area around Poznań, in western Poland.

Rozmiarek is also found as a surname in the United States, Germany, Austria, Switzerland, France, and Estonia. It appeared as a surname in the U.S. Census as early as 1900. The surname Rozmiarek was counted 194 times in the U.S. Census of 2000. Of those individuals counted, 97.42% were identified as white. Wisconsin and Nebraska are the U.S. states with the most listings for Rozmiarek. There are 21 states with listings.

== People ==
Rozmiarek as a surname may refer to:

- Harry Rozmiarek (1939–2013), American veterinarian
- Henryk Rozmiarek (1949–2021), Polish handball player
