= Jeremy Borseth =

American football player (born 1976)

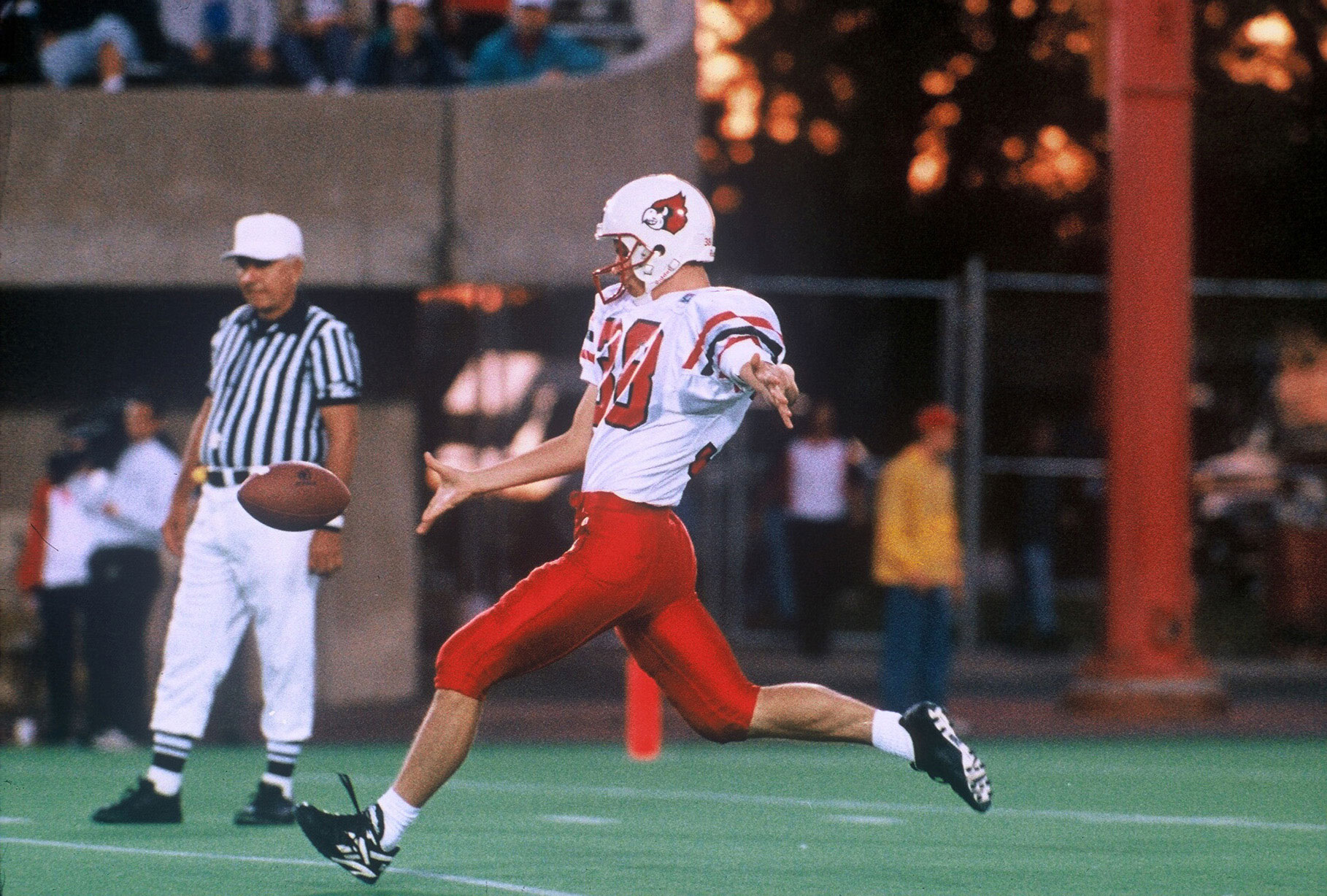
- Borseth punting for Louisville

No. 38
- Positions: Punter, holder
- Class: 1998

Personal information
- Born: November 6, 1976 (age 50); Green Bay, Wisconsin, U.S.
- Listed height: 6 ft 2 in (1.88 m)
- Listed weight: 220 lb (100 kg)

Career information
- High school: Pulaski High School

Jeremy John Borseth (born November 6, 1976) is an American former football punter who played college football at the University of Louisville. Playing for the Louisville Cardinals football team from 1995 to 1998, he earned All-Conference USA honors.

== Early life ==
Borseth was born in Green Bay, Wisconsin. He played high school football and competed in track and field at Pulaski High School in Pulaski, Wisconsin.

== College career ==
Borseth earned an athletic scholarship to the University of Louisville. He started as a true freshman in 1995 and played four years for the Louisville Cardinals football team, ending his collegiate career in 1998. Borseth was voted special teams player of the year in 1996, 1997, and 1998. As a senior, he was a member of the 1998 Louisville Cardinals football team that went 7–5 and earned a trip to the Motor City Bowl, capping the biggest turnaround in college football that year, rebounding from a 1–10 record in 1997. Borseth is the career punting leader for Louisville and Conference USA. He also holds the records for the highest punting average in Motor City Bowl history with a 49.3 yard average.

== Professional career ==
Borseth had stints with several National Football League teams including the Green Bay Packers, Cincinnati Bengals, and most notably the New England Patriots, with which he attended mini camps and off-season training sessions for two years.

== Personal ==
Borseth remained in Louisville, Kentucky for 15 years working for legendary horse racetrack Churchill Downs, home of the Kentucky Derby. He now resides in Green Bay, Wisconsin with his wife Kristy.
