= Zdovc =

Zdovc is a Slovenian surname. Notable people with the surname include:

- Anja Zdovc (born 1987), Slovenian volleyball player
- Jure Zdovc (born 1966), Slovenian basketball player and coach
- Sonja Merljak Zdovc (born 1972), Slovenian journalist and writer
