= Pulaski News =

The Pulaski News is a bi-weekly student-operated non-profit newspaper in Pulaski, Wisconsin, with a circulation of approximately 3,000. It was started in 1938. It reaches residents of not only Pulaski, but also of other communities in the area. The editor-in-chief and all staff members are high school students. It is the oldest student-led community newspaper in the United States.

== Brief history ==
The Pulaski News began in 1938 and became the community paper in 1939 when the community paper, the Pulaski Tricopa, went out of business. The superintendent of the schools, Frank X. Joswick, suggested that the school take over the community paper when it went bankrupt.

Then, in 1942, students at Pulaski High School turned the school newspaper, Pulaski High News, into the Pulaski News, and students began reporting on news from the community. The paper is run by the school, but available to the entire community. The Pulaski News has done so well, that in 1964, the closest weekly paper offered to buy the subscription list from them, though the Pulaski News declined the offer.

== Development ==
The Pulaski News began as a four-page tabloid, published fortnightly. It later became a weekly publication of eight pages. Beginning with only a handful of subscribers, by 1958 there were 2,000 subscribers. By 1998, more than 60 years later, the newspaper has a circulation of over 3,000 and a budget of $68,000. Today the paper is published every other Thursday.

== Awards ==
The Pulaski News has received a number of awards and recognitions since its establishment. Awards include:

- The State of Wisconsin Department of Public Instruction recognized the Pulaski News for its commitment and dedication to the Year of Family in Education Program, making Pulaski High School the only high school in Wisconsin so recognized.
- The Wisconsin Press Women's Association honored the Pulaski News for excellence in news articles and feature articles.
- The Wisconsin Associated Press and Marquette University honored the Pulaski News for its feature writing.
- The Pulaski News was honored for news coverage by the Northeastern Wisconsin Scholastic Press Association.
- 1965, The Quill and Scroll Newspaper Critical Service, George H. Gallup Award
- 1989, Certificate of Appreciation from the Wisconsin Department of Public Instruction.
- 1992–1993 FFA National Distinguished Service Award
- 1992–1993 Phi Delta Kappa Student/Community Award
- 1995–1996 JC Penney Golden Rule Award
- 1995–1996 FFA Distinguished Service Award
- 1997–1998 Wisconsin School Public Relations Association Spectrum Award for Excellence
- 1997–1998 School Bell award from Wisconsin Education Association Council
- 1998–1999 Wisconsin School Public Relations Association Spectrum Award for Excellence
- 1999–2000 Wisconsin School Public Relations Association Spectrum Award for Merit
- 2000–2001 Wisconsin School Public Relations Association Spectrum Award for Excellence
- 2000–2001 School Bell award from Wisconsin Education Association Council
- 2001–2002 Wisconsin Newspaper Association photographic award
- 2001–2002 Our Town Award
- 2001–2002 Wisconsin Public Service Golden Rule Award
- 2001–2002 Pulaski Area Chamber of Commerce Community Service Achievement Award
- 2002–2003 Wisconsin State Superintendent of Public Instruction Friend of Education Award (First recipient in the state)
- Wisconsin School Public Relations Association Spectrum award (Special Purpose Brochure/ Handbook)
- 2002–2003 Wisconsin School Public Relations Association Spectrum award (Special One-time Only Project)
- 2002–2003 Wisconsin School Public Relations Association Award
- 2002–2003 Pulaski Community School District Frank X. Joswick School–Community Relations Recognition
- 2002–2003 Wisconsin FFA Honorary Degree
- 2002–2003 Wisconsin Public Service Golden Rule Award
- 2002–2003 Partners in Education Golden Apple Partner Award (for Northeastern Wisconsin)
- 2002–2003 Green Bay Area High School Bowling Conference Association Award
- 2002–2003 Tri-County Community Corporation Frank X. Joswick Family Award
- 2003–2004 Wisconsin School Public Relations Association Spectrum award
- 2003–2004 School Bell Award from the Wisconsin Education Association Council
- 2007 National School Public Relations Association (NSPRA) Golden Achievement Award
- 2009 Wisconsin School Public Relations Association Award of Merit

== Notable reporters ==
- Jacqui Banaszynski, worked as associate editor in 1970 and went on to become a Pulitzer Prize winning journalist.
