= Georelational data model =

A georelational data model is a geographic data model that represents geographic features as an interrelated set of spatial and attribute data. The georelational model was the dominant form of vector file format during the 1980s and 1990s, including the Esri coverage and Shapefile.

== History ==
The second era in the history of GIS, starting in the mid-1970s, was characterized by the rise of the first general-purpose GIS software programs (rather than the bespoke systems created in the 1960s and early 1970s). Each of these programs also created its own data file structures, primarily focused on finding innovative ways to store the spatial or geometric aspect of the data in the most efficient and error-free way. One example of this was the POLYVRT software and data structure (1973) from the Harvard Laboratory for Computer Graphics and Spatial Analysis, which inspired the Arc/INFO Coverage format. In experimental GIS software such as ODYSSEY, attribute data was only handled in a rudimentary way. Meanwhile, the relational database was quickly becoming the most promising software for managing non-spatial data, and several nascent GIS software companies chose to adopt it into their systems, especially Esri.

Although there were exceptions such as the object-oriented data models in Smallworld GIS (1989) and Intergraph's experimental TIGRIS, georelational data dominated the GIS industry until the rise of spatial databases in the late 1990s. Most of them are obsolete, although the Shapefile is still in common (if decreasing) use.

== Georelational formats ==
In any vector data structure, the core unit is an object (either a geographic feature or a sample location for a field) that has a location in space (of 0, 1, 2, or 3 dimension) and a set of attributes. In the georelational model, these are stored as separate files: a geometry file that is usually custom-designed by a software developer for use in a particular program, and an attribute table that follows relational database principles; often, the latter is adopted directly from an existing relational database management system software.

Examples of commonly used georelational data formats include:

ARC/INFO Coverage (Esri 1981-2005)
The name ARC/INFO literally reflected the georelational design of the software and the coverage format. The ARC model or Coverage was the topological vector data structure developed by ESRI, based on earlier structures developed at Harvard such as POLYVRT. INFO was a relational database developed by Henco Software, Inc. (originally for financial management) that was licensed by ESRI. In the Coverage structure, each point, line, or polygon had an identification number, which could be joined to the row in the INFO table with the same primary key, as in a relational table join. In an ARC/INFO workspace (=directory/folder), all of the INFO tables were stored in a separate directory from the directories for the ARC data for each coverage. To process attribute data, the user had to leave the ARC program and start the INFO program. During the 1990s, Esri added support for other commercial RDBMS software for the attribute data.

MGE (Intergraph 1989-2000)
During the 1980s, Intergraph was an industry leader on workstation CAD with its IGDS software, including Microstation (developed by Bentley Systems). When it developed MGE (Modular GIS Environment), its first flagship GIS product, it directly incorporated the Microstation software as its interactive environment, and the Microstation Design File (.dgn, a non-topological vector graphics file format) for storing graphics. The associated attribute table could be stored in any RDBMS supported on Intergraph UNIX workstations, Informix being one of the most common. An ID attached to each object in the design file enabled a relational join to the rows in the attribute table.

Shapefile (Esri 1992–present)
As the GIS industry grew to incorporate more casual users, the inherent complexity of the coverage data structure became a concern. When Esri released ArcView GIS 2.0 in 1992, it introduced the new shapefile format for vector data. This was a much simpler data model, eliminating features such as topology, but was still a georelational design. A shape-"file" actually consisted of several files, including at the very least a .shp file to store the geometry, and a .dbf file for the attributes, the latter directly adopting the dBase format that was the dominant microcomputer database at the time (despite it being a proprietary trade secret, the .dbf format had been legally reverse-engineered by the xBase community and published). Rather than using a relational join to connect the two files, the shapefile merely uses file order: the first shape matches the first attribute row, and so on.

== See also ==
- GIS data model
