= Bruce Donald =

American computer scientist and computational biologist

Bruce R. Donald
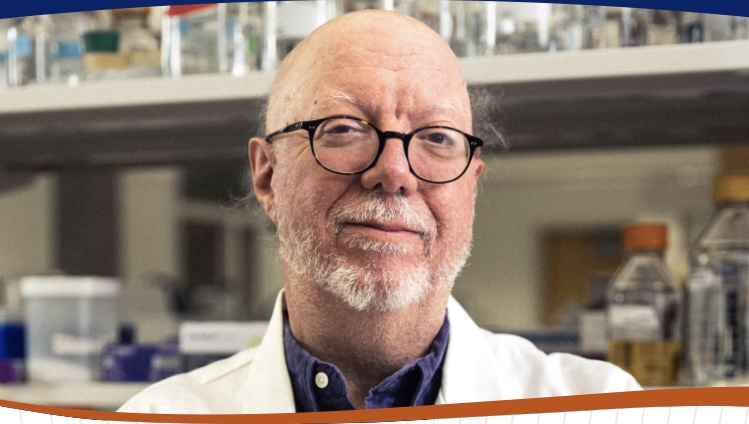
- Bruce Donald in his laboratory at Duke University (2023).
- Born: 1958 (age 67–68)
- Education: Yale; MIT
- Awards: Presidential Young Investigator Award; Guggenheim Fellowship; Fellow of the ACM; Fellow of the IEEE; Fellow of the AAAS
- Scientific career
- Fields: Computational Biology; Computer Science; Computational Chemistry; Molecular Design; Robotics; Nanotechnology
- Workplaces: Harvard University; Cornell University; Stanford University; Interval Research; Dartmouth College; Duke University
- Thesis: Error Detection and Recovery for Robot Motion Planning with Uncertainty (1987)
- Doctoral advisor: Tomás Lozano-Pérez

Bruce Randall Donald (born 1958) is an American computer scientist and computational biologist. He is the James B. Duke Professor of Computer Science and Biochemistry at Duke University. He has made numerous contributions to several fields in Computer Science such as robotics, Microelectromechanical Systems (MEMS), Geometric & physical algorithms and computational geometry, as well as in areas of Structural Molecular Biology & Biochemistry such as Protein design, Protein Structure Determination and Computational Chemistry.

== Life and career ==
Donald received a B.A. summa cum laude in Russian Language and Literature from Yale University in 1980. After working at the Laboratory for Computer Graphics and Spatial Analysis in the Graduate School of Design at Harvard University, he then attended MIT EECS, where he received his S.M. in EECS (1984) and Ph.D. in Computer Science (1987) under the supervision of professor Tomás Lozano-Pérez in the MIT AI Lab (Artificial Intelligence Laboratory). He joined the Cornell University Department of Computer Science as an assistant professor in 1987.

At Cornell, Donald received tenure in 1993, and served as associate professor of computer science at Cornell University until 1998. While on sabbatical at Stanford University (1994-1996), he worked at Paul Allen's research & development and technology incubator Interval Research Corporation (1995-1997), where he and Tom Ngo co-invented Embedded Constraint Graphics. After moving to Dartmouth, Donald was the Joan P. and Edward J. Foley Jr 1933 Professor of Computer Science, Dartmouth College until 2006 when he moved to Duke University. Currently Donald is the James B. Duke Professor of Computer Science, Chemistry, and Biochemistry, in the Trinity College of Arts and Sciences at Duke University and in the School of Medicine, Duke University Medical Center. Donald was appointed William and Sue Gross Professor from 2006 to 2012, and was named James B. Duke Professor in 2012.

He is a fellow of the Association for Computing Machinery (ACM) and a fellow of the IEEE. Previously, he was a Guggenheim Fellow (2001–2002) and received a National Science Foundation Presidential Young Investigator Award (1989–1994). In 2015, Donald was elected a fellow of the American Association for the Advancement of Science (AAAS), for contributions to computational molecular biology.

== Work ==
Donald's early research was in the field of robotic motion planning and distributed manipulation. Later he has made numerous contributions to MEMS and Micro-robotics, and designed MEMS micro-robots with dimensions of 60 μm by 250 μm by 10 μm.

Recently, he has conducted research in the areas of Structural Molecular Biology; chiefly, Protein Design and Protein Structure Determination from NMR data. He has developed numerous algorithms for protein design which have been successfully tested experimentally in the wet lab. The protein design algorithms attempt to incorporate additional molecular flexibility into the design process by using ensembles and continuously flexible rotamers and backbones. Donald has also developed algorithms for determining the structures of biomedically significant proteins. For example, his subgroup algorithm CRANS (Acta Crystallogr. D 2004; J. Biol. Chem. 2003), which identifies cross-rotation peaks consistent with non-crystallographic symmetry, was used in the structure determination of the enzyme dihydrofolate reductase-thymidylate synthase (DHFR-TS) from Cryptosporidium hominis, an important advancement in Cryptosporidium biology. He has designed many algorithms and computational protocols to extract structural information from NMR data, and used that information to compute structures of globular proteins and symmetric homo-oligomers. A distinct feature of his algorithms is that they use less data, and provide complexity-theoretic guarantees on time and space (See, e.g., B. R. Donald and J. Martin. "Automated NMR Assignment and Protein Structure Determination using Sparse Dipolar Coupling Constraints." Progress in NMR Spectroscopy 2009; 55(2):101-127). Donald is the author of Algorithms in Structural Molecular Biology, a textbook published by MIT Press (2011).

== Students ==
Donald has supervised many students and postdocs, many of whom are now professors in reputed universities such as MIT, Carnegie-Mellon University, University of Washington, Seattle, University of Massachusetts Amherst, Dartmouth College, Duke University, Middlebury College and University of Toronto, and researchers at organizations such as NIAID, NIST, IBM, Sandia National Laboratories.

== Personal life ==
Donald is the son of historian David Herbert Donald and historian and editor Aida DiPace Donald.

== See also ==
- MEMS
- Protein design
- NMR
- Protein Structure
- Kinodynamic planning

== Publications ==
Donald is the author of over 100 publications. A representative selection includes:

- Kinodynamic Motion Planning. Bruce Randall Donald, Patrick G. Xavier, John F. Canny, John H. Reif. J. ACM 40(5): 1048-1066 (1993).
- Phylogenetic classification of protozoa based on the structure of the linker domain in the bifunctional enzyme, dihydrofolate reductase-thymidylate synthase. Robert H. O'Neil, Ryan H. Lilien, Bruce R. Donald, Robert M. Stroud and Amy C. Anderson. J Biol Chem 2003. 278(52):52980-7.
- Lilien, Ryan H.; Bailey-Kellogg, Chris; Anderson, Amy C.; Donald, Bruce R. (2004). "A subgroup algorithm to identify cross-rotation peaks consistent with non-crystallographic symmetry". Acta Crystallogr D. 60 (6): 1057–67. Bibcode:2004AcCrD..60.1057L. CiteSeerX 10.1.1.152.8692. doi:10.1107/S090744490400695X. PMID 15159565. S2CID 249011865.
- Wang, Lincong; Mettu, Ramgopal R.; Donald, Bruce R. (2006). "A Polynomial-Time Algorithm for De Novo Protein Backbone Structure Determination from NMR Data". Journal of Computational Biology. 13 (7): 1276–1288. CiteSeerX 10.1.1.126.9049. doi:10.1089/cmb.2006.13.1267. PMID 17037958.
- Potluri, S.; Yan, A.; Chou, J.; Donald, Bruce R.; Bailey-Kellogg, C. (2006). "Structure Determination of Symmetric Homo-oligomers by a Complete Search of Symmetry Configuration Space Using NMR Restraints and van der Waals Packing". Proteins. 65 (1): 203–219. CiteSeerX 10.1.1.137.318. doi:10.1002/prot.21091. PMID 16897780. S2CID 1500512.
- Georgiev, Ivelin; Lilien, Ryan H.; Donald, Bruce R. (2008). "The Minimized Dead-End Elimination Criterion and Its Application to Protein Redesign in a Hybrid Scoring and Search Algorithm for Computing Partition Functions over Molecular Ensembles". Journal of Computational Chemistry. 29 (10): 1527–42. doi:10.1002/jcc.20909. PMC 3263346. PMID 18293294.
- Cheng-; Chen, Yu; Georgiev, Ivelin; Anderson, Amy C.; Donald, Bruce R. (2009). "Computational structure-based redesign of enzyme activity". Proceedings of the National Academy of Sciences. 106 (10): 3764–9. Bibcode:2009PNAS..106.3764C. doi:10.1073/pnas.0900266106. PMC 2645347. PMID 19228942.
- Zeng, J.; Boyles, J.; Tripathy, C.; Wang, L.; Yan, A.; Zhou, P.; Donald, Bruce R. (2009). "High-Resolution Protein Structure Determination Starting with a Global Fold Calculated from Exact Solutions to the RDC Equations". Journal of Biomolecular NMR. 45 (3): 265–281. doi:10.1007/s10858-009-9366-3. PMC 2766249. PMID 19711185.
