= Tomás Lozano-Pérez =

American roboticist

- Born: Guantanamo, Cuba
- Education: Massachusetts Institute of Technology
- Scientific career
- Fields: Robotics, Motion Planning
- Workplaces: Massachusetts Institute of Technology
- Thesis: Spatial Planning with Polyhedral Models (1980)
- Doctoral advisor: Berthold K.P. Horn
- Notable students: Matthew T. Mason; Bruce Donald

Tomás Lozano-Pérez is a Cuban-American computer science professor at the Massachusetts Institute of Technology and member of MIT's Computer Science and Artificial Intelligence Laboratory. On the MIT faculty since 1981, he conducts research in robotics, motion planning and geometric algorithms, and their applications.

== Awards and honors ==
- 2025 National Academy of Engineering
- 2011 IEEE Robotics Pioneer Award
- 1985 Presidential Young Investigator Award
- A Fellow of the Association for the Advancement of Artificial Intelligence, a Fellow of the Association for Computing Machinery (ACM), and a Fellow of the Institute of Electrical and Electronics Engineers
