= William Warntz =

American geographer

William Warntz (1922–1988) was an American mathematical geographer based at the Harvard Laboratory for Computer Graphics and Spatial Analysis. He was a "pioneer in mathematical approaches to spatial analysis".

== Life ==
Warntz studied economics at the University of Pennsylvania, gaining a PhD there. His papers are held at Cornell University Library.

== Works ==
- Toward a geography of price; a study in geo-econometrics, 1959
- Geography now and then: some notes on the history of academic geography in the United States, 1964
- Geographers and what they do, 1964
- Macrogeography and income fronts, 1965
- Breakthroughs in geography, 1971
