= Sonja Merljak Zdovc =

Slovenian journalist and author (born 1972)

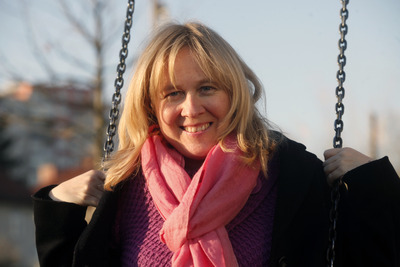
Sonja Merljak Zdovc

Sonja Merljak Zdovc (born 26 October 1972, in Koper) is a Slovenian journalist and author. She is the former executive editor of the Slovenian newspaper Delo, known for her columns and feature stories, her writings on literary journalism in Republic of Slovenia, her novels Dekle kot Tisa and Njeni tujci, as well as for her books on history of journalism in the Slovene Lands. In 2015, she founded Časoris, Slovenia's award-winning free online newspaper for children.

== Biography ==
Sonja Merljak Zdovc was born in Koper, Slovenia. After finishing the gymnasium in Koper, she enrolled in the University of Ljubljana, where she studied English language and journalism. After graduation, she began to work as a journalist for the national daily newspaper Delo. In 2001/2002, she spent a year in the United States as a Fulbright scholar. She became acquainted with literary journalism, while studying at the University of Missouri's Missouri School of Journalism in Columbia, Missouri. Among her professors was also the Pulitzer Prize winner Jacqui Banaszynski. In 2004, she successfully defended her PhD thesis on Tom Wolfe's New Journalism in Slovenia and USA at the University of Ljubljana. Soon she began teaching journalism courses at different universities in Slovenia. In the 1990s, she became an active member of media watch movement that strives to improve the quality of journalism in Slovenia.

== Work ==
Sonja Merljak Zdovc first gained recognition as a feature writer working for the national daily newspaper Delo. She focused on the stories from everyday life and of those who rarely gain access to the mainstream media. Later, she began to mostly write analytical articles about education, discrimination, inequality and violence. As the executive editor of Delo (2010-2013) she oversaw its transition to a digital-first brand. As a scholar, she is researching the state of journalism, literary journalism and media literacy. In the past she was researching also history of journalism. As a lecturer she was teaching journalism courses at the Faculty of Social Sciences, University of Ljubljana, Faculty of Humanities Koper, University of Primorska and Literary Journalism in East and Central Europe at Central European University's summer school. She is a member of International Association of Literary Journalism Studies; in 2008-2010 she was its membership committee co-chair (with Lynn Van Luven). She is now the editor of Slovenia's online newspaper for children Časoris.

== Major works ==
- Njeni tujci (Her Strangers: a novel), Ljubljana: Miš, 2011;
- Pricevalci Delovega casa (Witnesses of Delo's Time), Ljubljana: Delo, 2010;
- Dekle kot Tisa (A Girl Like Tisa: a novel), Ljubljana: Miš, 2008;
- Literary journalism in the United States of America and Slovenia, Lanham: University Press of America, 2008;
- Literarno novinarstvo: pojav in raba sodobne pripovedne novinarske vrste v ZDA in Sloveniji, Ljubljana: Modrijan, 2008;
- Preteklost je prolog: pregled zgodovine novinarstva na Slovenskem in po svetu (The Past is a Prologue: the brief overview of history of journalism in Slovenia and abroad), Ljubljana: FDV, 2007.

== Awards ==
- 2025: as the founder of Časoris she received the 1st prize at the 21st SozialMarie Award Ceremony for social innovation across Europe.
- 2024: as the founder of the Časoris's Media Literacy Portal she received the Prometheus of Science award for excellence in science communication.
- 2019: as the author of Časoris's Stories of Children from around the World, she received the Intercultural Achievement Award in the Category Media.
- 2019: as the editor-in-chief of Časoris she was among the ten finalists for the first European Media Literacy Award.
- 2016: as the Slovenian finalist shortlisted for the European Journalism Award on Diversity.
- 2008: nominated for the Slovene Woman of the Year Award.
- 2008: the Slovene candidate for the 'For Diversity. Against Discrimination.' Journalist Award.
- 2007: the Slovene candidate for the European Year of Equal Opportunities for All Special Award.
