= Geodat =

Geodat was a commercial project, begun in 1980 and completed by 1991, that provided digital geographic mapping data for commercial users at scales equal to or greater than 1:1,000,000. The term "Geodat" was derived from "GEOgraphic DATa". Geodat data was primarily "medium scale", a nominal 1:100,000, but ranged from 1:50,000 to 1:250,000. The cartographic data was vector-based digitisation of coastline, hydrography, internal and international political boundaries, primary transportation routes and city locations. The data was intended to be used on its own to produce quick, cheap, consistent maps, initially for oil exploration firms. Harry Wassall, the founder of Petroconsultants SA, a Geneva-based energy information services firm, began the project in 1979 by hiring a researcher from the Harvard Laboratory for Computer Graphics and Spatial Analysis, Michael Mainelli, to explore how to automate Petroconsultants' extensive paper map series. Mainelli became Project Director in 1981. Petroconsultants concluded that a cooperative project among the oil firms acknowledged the high degree of overlap in their computer mapping interests.

Petroconsultants SA assessed client interest at a meeting in Geneva on 20–21 August 1981 with attendees from Amoco, BP, Cities Service, Deminex, Elf Acquitaine, Exxon, Gulf and Shell. The need for computerised mapping data was high and the response positive enough to form an advisory committee with paid sponsorship. The sponsors commissioned Petroconsultants to produce four sample digitised maps of the Ivory Coast. The Ivorian pilot project resulted in four 1:200,000 maps with 800 features and 40,000 data points. The pilot established Common Geographic Format (CGF) records, for a time the industry standard for computer cartographic information exchange. These digitised map files, and their attendant file structures, feature codes, segment records, map records, annotation records and set records were reviewed at a meeting in Dublin on 10–11 November 1981 with participation from Amoco, BP, Chevron, Cities Service, Elf Acquitaine, Exxon, Gulf, Phillips Petroleum and Shell. Geodat was formally launched in Houston on 9–10 February 1982 with attendees from Amoco, BP, Chevron, Elf Acquitaine, Exxon, Getty, Gulf, Texas Easter and Union Texas. Four primary sponsors were Shell, BP, Elf Acquitaine and Chevron, while ten other firms were partial sponsors. Full sponsors received a guarantee of six million digitised points (approximately 360 maps) digitised to a specified quality level.

First data delivery was in June 1983, consisting of 57 maps and 1.24 million points. By the end of 1985, Geodat had delivered twenty million data points and 750 map sheets in the 1:50,000 to 1:250,000 scale range. Alongside mainstream production for the project sponsors, the Geodat project produced a complete digital map of the world at a scale of 1:1,000,000, MundoCart, in 1985. MundoCart was based on digitisation of paper prints of the United States Defense Mapping Agency's (DMA) Operational Navigation Chart (ONC) 1:1,000,000 scale paper map series, produced by the US, Australia, Canada, and the United Kingdom. ONC charts were designed to meet the needs of pilots and air crews in medium-and low-altitude navigation and to support military operational planning, intelligence briefings, and other needs. Some 270 1:1million maps, plus six 1:2million maps for Antarctica, resulted in 30 million data points. MundoCart provided numerous commercial and academic Geographic information system (GIS) users with their first complete vector map of the world. The data was sold, along with a complete set of FORTRAN mapping software, by Petroconsultants (CES), a UK subsidiary of Petroconsultants SA, subsequently sold to IHS in 1996, that sponsored the project.

Prior to Geodat, the only complete digital map of the world was World Data Bank 2 (WDB-II), a dataset digitized between 1972 and 1977 by the US Department of State's (DoS) Central Intelligence Agency (CIA). WDBII was of variable scale, nominally 1:3,000,000 but digitised from sources ranging from 1:1,000,000 to 1:4,000,000, and of variable quality. WDB-II was released at nominal cost from 1977, but users desired higher resolution and more consistent quality. Until the release of the US Department of Defense's Digital Chart of the World in 1992, and subsequent free issue from 2006, MundoCart was the primary global GIS database for commercial users.

Geodat was unusual in the 1980s in that the software was often given away free, while data downloads or tapes were charged. Geodat set out a quality management process for digitisation covering acquisition, cataloguing, map stability, transformation algorithms, merging and node coalescing. Geodat also set out a quality standard for comparing digitised maps with source maps, based on using generalisation and interpolation against a maximum orthogonal offset distance. Originally delivered as five large tapes, MundoCart was burned on CD-ROM in 1987. MundoCart was one of the first CD-ROM applications not brought out by the creators, Philips and Sony. In the early releases of MundoCart, a CD-ROM reader accompanied each purchase.

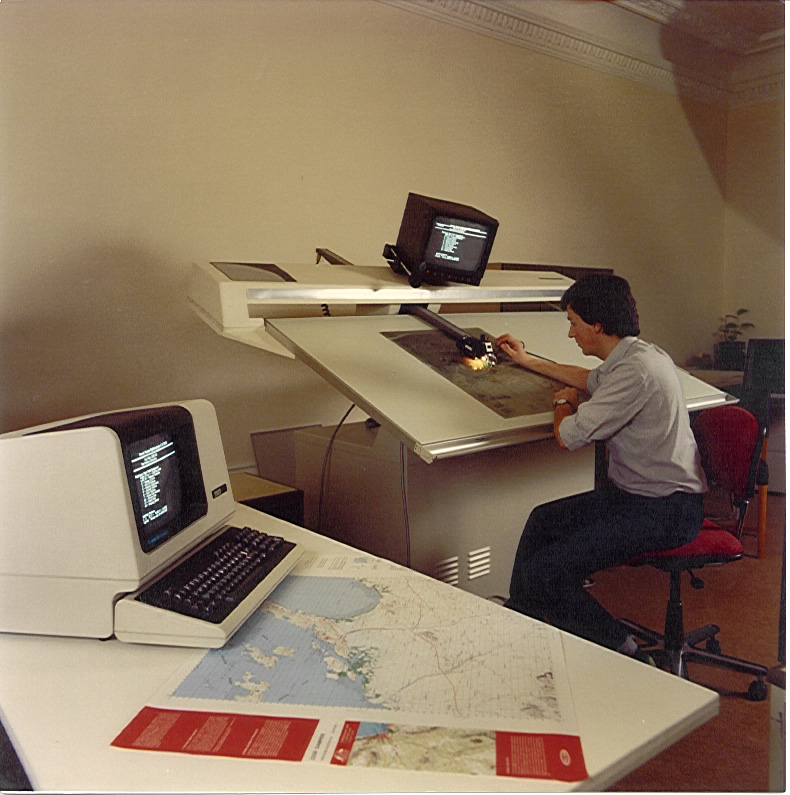
Laser line following digitiser (circa 1983)

Production was based from late 1982 to 1991 in Burleigh House, Newmarket Road in Cambridge, England. Coincidentally, Burleigh House had been the former Star Brewery headquarters and the cellars provided good storage facilities for paper maps. At its height, the project employed 30 people, principally programmers and digitisers. Processing was based on hand digitisation using DEC PDP-11 minicomputers alongside digitisation tables. Further processing was done on DEC VAX computers. The computer programs were almost entirely written in FORTRAN, though some PL/1 and assembler programming was used. At the time, scanning systems were not suitable for large-scale production, but the project did help design, build and use a laser line-following digitiser, combining a laser photovoltaic feedback system with stepper motors, mounted on a cowboy boot sewing machine chassis from the USA. The effect of the laser line-following digitiser was that the operator felt as if he or she was directing the laser along a "groove" that followed the line being acquired.

The Geodat project drew heavily on the experience of the Harvard Laboratory for Computer Graphics and Spatial Analysis, founded in 1963 and disbanded in 1991. Unable to purchase the Laboratory's software while Harvard University was exploring licensing options, Geodat developed its own software. The Laboratory and Geodat both employed "flat" computer files and streamed processing, instead of hierarchical and direct access processing. Wherever possible, the software operated in FORTRAN processing sequential files to enhance portability among operating systems. Geodat also emulated other Laboratory ideas, most notably the idea of "cycling", using software to resolve disconnected vectors.
