= Časoris =

Slovenian online newspaper for children

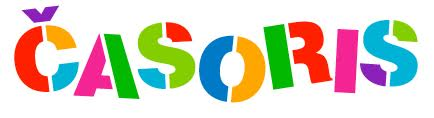
- Časoris
- Type: daily online newspaper for children
- Publisher: Časoris, zavod za informiranje in izobraževanje
- Editor: Sonja Merljak Zdovc
- Political alignment: Independent
- Language: Slovenian
- Country: Slovenia
- Website: Časoris

Časoris is a Slovenian online newspaper for children. It provides timely, relevant news articles for children, teachers in the classroom and parents at home. Časoris received international acclaim in 2019, when it was nominated for the first European Media Literacy Award. In the same year, its Stories of Children from around the World received the Intercultural Achievement Award in the Media Category. The project also won the Clarinet Project Award in the Web and Social Media category.

== Content ==
It is read by children aged 6 to 12 year old.

It aims to present news about current events from Slovenia and abroad in a child-friendly format, alongside news on entertainment, science and sport. Every article is written in a kids-friendly language and it is accompanied by questions for additional reflection and a glossary.

In a special section there is also information for parents and teachers.

== Authors ==
Časoris was founded by Sonja Merljak Zdovc. A team of professional journalists and children contribute news articles daily.

It was founded in April 2015 – in the aftermath of the January’s terrorist attack in Paris. At the time when many parents were wondering how to explain what happened to their children, an article by Wan Ifra about how a French newspaper for children did just that sparked the idea to create a newspaper for children also in Slovenia.

The team behind Časoris strongly believes that children can and want to understand the news if it is put in context for them and presented in kids-friendly language.

With Časoris they are trying to help them to understand the news, to critically think about what they’re reading, and to apply their knowledge to the real world.

== Awards ==
- Shortlisted for the first European Media Literacy Award.
- Intercultural Achievement Award in the Media Category.
- Clarinet Project Award in the Web and Social Media Category.
- 1st prize SozialMarie Award.
