= Aida DiPace Donald =

American editor and historian

- Born: 1930 (age 95–96); New York City
- Education: Barnard College Columbia University University of Rochester

Aida DiPace Donald (1930–2023) was an American editor and historian.

== Biography ==
She worked as an editor at the Harvard University Press for 27 years, focusing for years on history and social science books, and eventually rising to the position of editor-in-chief. She worked with writers like Lawrence Tribe, and translators like Arthur Goldhammer. Though no women have held the directorship, Donald was one of few women to lead significant parts of the Press. She also taught at Columbia University.

She was married to historian David Donald from 1955 until his death in 2009. They had one son, computer scientist Bruce Donald. She earned her PhD at the University of Rochester, studying 19th century American history.

== Books ==
- Prelude to Civil War: The decline of the Whig party in New York, 1848-1852 (dissertation, 1961) ISBN 0061313599, 978-0061313592
- Diary of Charles Francis Adams (edited, 1964)
- John F. Kennedy and the New Frontier (edited, 1968) ISBN 3638779416, 978-3638779418
- Lion in the White House: A Life of Theodore Roosevelt (2007) ISBN 978-0-465-00213-9.
- Citizen Soldier: A Life of Harry S. Truman (2012) ISBN 978-0-465-03307-2.
