= Pulaski High School =

Location
- 1040 S. St. Augustine Ave; Pulaski, Wisconsin; United States
- Coordinates: 44.65889°N 88.24005°W

Information
- Type: Public
- School district: Pulaski Community School District
- Teaching staff: 74.37 (FTE)
- Grades: 9–12
- Enrollment: 1,118 (2023-2024)
- Student to teacher ratio: 15.03
- Colors: Cardinal Red, White, Black
- Mascot: Red Raider
- Website: http://www.pulaskischools.org/high/

Pulaski High School is a public high school in Pulaski, Wisconsin, United States, in Brown County (school district also serves parts of Shawano, Outagamie and Oconto counties), that serves students in grades 9 through 12. Its mascot is the Red Raider.

== History ==
The original school was built in 1909, with additions throughout the next five decades. In 1975, the high school took over an existing school along with other additions, most notably an indoor swimming pool. Another new building was built in 1999 due to a rapidly growing population.

== Academics ==
Pulaski offers Advanced Placement classes. The student to teacher ratio is 18 to 1.

== Demographics ==
Over 90 percent of the student body is Caucasian, while 2.9 percent are American Indian, 2.5 percent are Hispanic, 1.4 percent are African American and 1.0 percent are Asian. The school is split 51/49 male to female, while just over 22 percent of the school is eligible for free or reduced lunch.

== Athletics ==
=== State championships ===
- Boys' Basketball: 2013
- Wrestling: 1969, 1974, 1993 (all runner-up)
- Football: 1980 (runner-up)
- Softball: 1996 (runner-up)
- Cross Country: 2004 (runner-up)
- Rugby: 2009, 2010, 2014, 2015, 2018

Pulaski has also had a number of individual state champions.

In 2016, Pulaski citizens privately funded a $4.9 million athletic expansion project, including a new football stadium, track, baseball and softball fields, as well as expanding the tennis facilities.

=== Incident involving Mike McCarthy ===
On February 27, 2019, the school became the center of attention during a basketball game against Notre Dame Academy after former Green Bay Packers head coach Mike McCarthy was berating officials during the game. A complaint was submitted to the Wisconsin Interscholastic Athletic Association following the incident. McCarthy's behavior was criticized as "unacceptable" from the Notre Dame Academy and Pulaski athletic director Janel Batten. A day later, McCarthy apologized for the incident.

=== Athletic conference affiliation history ===
- Little Nine Conference (1928-1933)
- Mid-Valley Conference (1946-1950)
- Northeastern Wisconsin Conference (1951-1970)
- Bay Conference (1970-2007)
- Fox River Classic Conference (2007–present)

== Music ==
The Red Raider Marching Band performed in the 2007, 2012, 2017 and 2024 Rose Parades and in the 2003 Macy's Thanksgiving Day Parade in New York City. The Red Raider Jazz Ensemble was a 2001 finalist in the Essentially Ellington High School Jazz Band Competition and Festival.

== Notable alumni ==
- Jacqui Banaszynski, Pulitzer Prize-winning writer
- Jeremy Borseth, NFL punter
- Carey Lohrenz, F-14 Tomcat pilot
- Neil Worden, NFL fullback
