= Petroconsultants =

Petroconsultants was an oil and gas exploration and scouting information company formed in 1968 in Geneva to take over the activities of Harry Wassall and Associates, which was founded in Havana in 1956. Petroconsultants collected information about oil and gas wells and fields from around the world and published this information in various forms. Oil companies purchased this information as a means of keeping up with competitors and, in return, donated information they wished known publicly; information also came from local agents of Petroconsultants. Petroconsultants was also a major producer of maps and initiated the first commercial global digital map project, Geodat in 1980.

At its peak in the 1980s, Petroconsultants had some 200 major clients and offices in Dublin, Cambridge, London, Houston, Singapore and Sydney. Over the years, Petroconsultants published hundreds of reports and employed hundreds of people. Notably, Petroconsultants was an early developer of computerized oil well and field databases and also of computerized cartography. Petroconsultants was acquired by IHS Group in 1996 and largely has been absorbed into that business.
