= Carey Lohrenz =

United States naval aviator

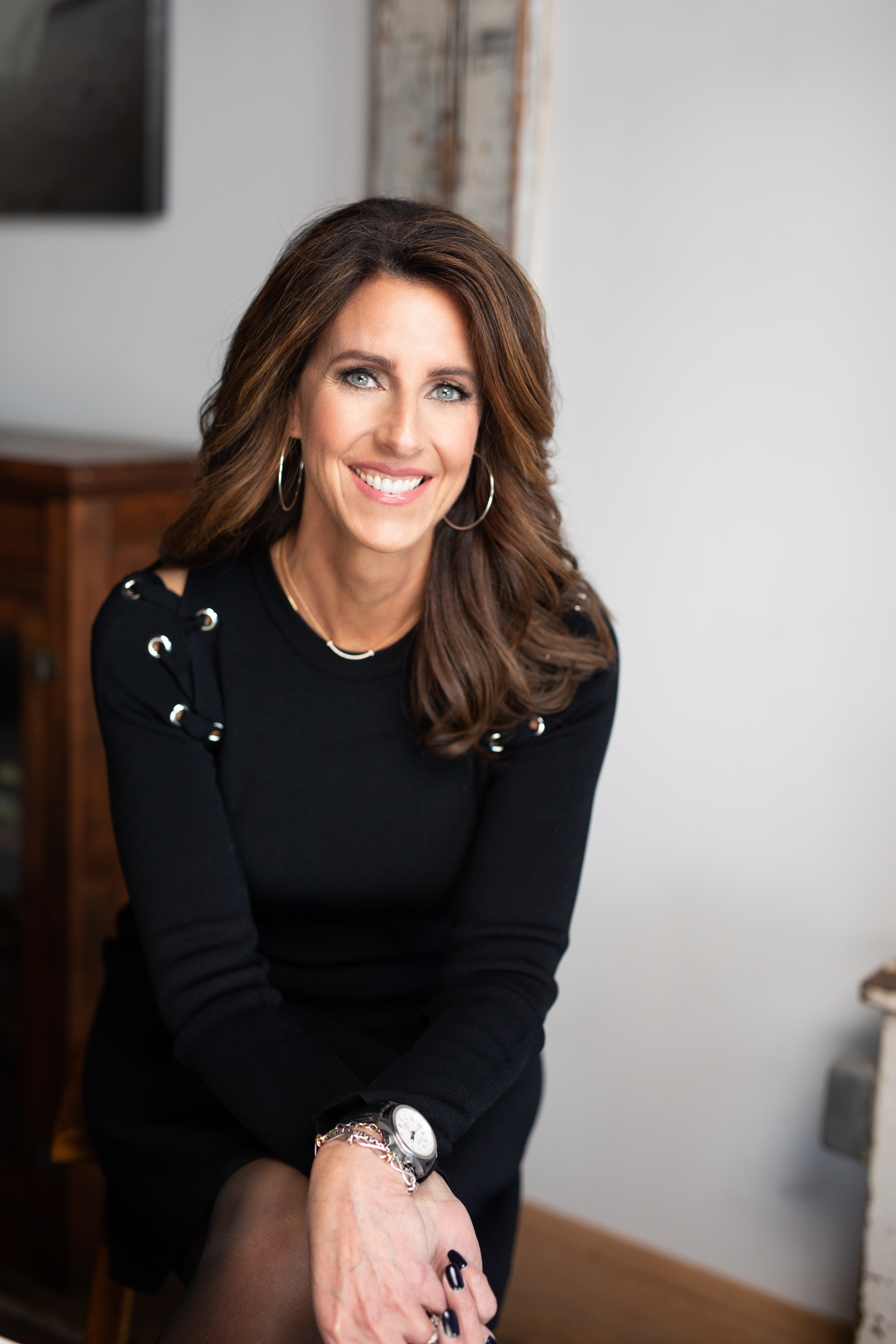
- Born: October 5, 1968 (age 57); Racine, Wisconsin, U.S.
- Occupations: former United States Navy fighter pilot, professional speaker
- Spouse: Donovan Lohrenz (m. 1994)
- Children: 4
- Military career
- Allegiance: United States
- Branch: United States Navy
- Service years: 1991–1999
- Rank: Lieutenant

Carey Dunai Lohrenz (born October 5, 1968) is a former lieutenant in the U.S. Navy who was one of the first fully qualified female naval aviators to fly the F-14 Tomcat in the U.S. military.

== Biography ==
Lohrenz was born in 1968 in Racine, Wisconsin, to Robert E. Dunai and Carol T. Dunai. Her father served in the military as a United States Marine Corps Aviator.

Raised in Green Bay, Wisconsin, Lohrenz graduated from Pulaski High School, where she was a member of the National Honor Society and played volleyball, basketball, and softball.

Lohrenz is a 1990 graduate of the University of Wisconsin, where she was a three-time varsity letter winner in rowing. In 1991, Lohrenz graduated from Aviation Officer Candidate School at Naval Air Station Pensacola, Florida. Commissioned an ensign in June 1991, Lohrenz was sent to flight school at Naval Air Station Corpus Christi, Texas, and then to Naval Air Station Kingsville, Texas, for advanced jet training.

Earning her wings in June 1993, Lohrenz receiving her Naval Aviator Wings of Gold from retired Commander Randall "Duke" Cunningham, one of the Navy's two fighter aces during the Vietnam War and later a U.S. congressman. She received follow-on orders to the F-14 Fleet Replacement Squadron, Fighter Squadron 124 (VF-124) at Naval Air Station Miramar, California. She was one of the two first female Naval Aviators in the U.S. Navy to train and fully qualify as fighter pilots in the F-14 Tomcat.

Resigning from the U.S. Navy in 1999, Lohrenz began a career as a leadership expert and professional speaker.

She wrote a Wall Street Journal best-selling book, Fearless Leadership: High-Performance Lessons From the Flight Deck, published by Greenleaf Book Group Press in 2014, about her experiences as a female aviator. In 2021, Carey Lohrenz wrote another Wall Street Journal best-selling book, Span of Control: What To Do When You're Under Pressure, Overwhelmed, And Ready To Get What You Really Want, published by Forbes.

== Personal life ==
On July 2, 1994, she married Donovan Lohrenz. They have four children.

== Television and radio appearances ==
Lohrenz has appeared on CNN, MSNBC, NBC, CBS, ABC, and NPR.

- CBS: Navy's first female fighter pilot on leadership, overcoming obstacles.
- NPR: For Family, For Country: Military Moms Do It All - discussing parenting in the military.
