= Harry Rozmiarek =

American academic (1939–2013)

- Born: March 27, 1939; Pulaski, Wisconsin, U.S.
- Died: June 15, 2013 (aged 74); Boston, Massachusetts
- Education: University of Minnesota (DVM) - 1962; Ohio State University (PhD) - 1976
- Known for: laboratory animal care, Chair of the AAALAC International Board of Trustees (2008)
- Scientific career
- Fields: Laboratory animal science
- Workplaces: Fox Chase Cancer Center

Harry Rozmiarek (March 27, 1939 – June 15, 2013) was a noted veterinarian, academic, and laboratory animal care specialist.

Rozmiarek was born in Pulaski, Wisconsin. He graduated from the University of Minnesota in 1962 with a veterinary degree. He joined the United States Army and was assigned as an attending army veterinarian at Fort Myer, Virginia. Among his duties, Rozmiarek attended to Black Jack, the famous riderless horse in the funeral of President John F. Kennedy. He also consulted on the health of the Kennedy family dog and cared for some Irish deer that had been a gift to Kennedy from the people of Ireland. The remainder of his 20-year military career took him to Thailand where he conducted infectious disease research with the Southeast Asia Treaty Organization (SEATO). And he spent several years as director of The U.S. Army Medical Research Institute of Infectious Diseases (USAMRIID) in Frederick, Maryland. He retired from the Army in 1983 with the rank of Colonel.

After the Army, Rozmiarek spent the next two decades in academia as a professor of laboratory animal medicine. In 1983 he went to Ohio State University where he served as Professor of Laboratory Animal Medicine and Director of University Laboratory Animal Resources through 1986. In 1987 he joined the University of Pennsylvania as University Veterinarian and Professor and Director of University Laboratory Animal Resources. He retired from the University of Pennsylvania in 2004. He was the Director of Laboratory Animal Medicine and Facilities at the Fox Chase Cancer Center in Philadelphia, Pennsylvania from 2004 until his death in 2013.

During his career, Rozmiarek was active in the development of guidelines for the proper care and use of laboratory animals in research. He served in leadership positions of national and international organizations that promote the humane treatment of animals in science including AAALAC, AALAS, ACLAM, and ICLAS. He was a contributing author to the IACUC Handbook.

Rozmiarek represented the United States as the National Member to the International Council for Laboratory Animal Science (ICLAS) from 2003 to 2013; was elected to the ICLAS Governing Board in 2007; and served as Secretary-General from 2011 to 2013 until his death. ICLAS is an international scientific organization advancing human and animal health by promoting the ethical care and use of laboratory animals in research worldwide.

Rozmiarek was the recipient of numerous awards for his lifetime of accomplishments in the area of laboratory animal care: the AALAS Research Award (1983); the AALAS Griffin Award (1995), the AVMA Charles River Prize (1996); the AAALAC Bennett J. Cohen Award (2012); the AALAS Nathan R. Brewer Lifetime Achievement Award (2013).

Harry Rozmiarek died in Boston, Massachusetts on June 15, 2013.
