= Harvard Laboratory for Computer Graphics and Spatial Analysis =

US research laboratory

- LCGSA
- Established: 1965 to 1991
- Field of research: thematic mapping, cartography, architecture
- Directors: Howard T. Fisher (1965-1968), William Warntz (1968-1970), Allan H Schmidt (1970-1976), Brian J L Berry (1976-1981), Daniel L Schodek (1981-1991)
- Staff: 40 (at peak)
- Location: Cambridge, Massachusetts, USA

The Harvard Laboratory for Computer Graphics and Spatial Analysis (1965 to 1991) pioneered early cartographic and architectural computer applications that led to integrated geographic information systems (GIS). Some of the Laboratory's influential programs included SYMAP, SYMVU, GRID, CALFORM, and POLYVRT. The Laboratory's Odyssey project created a geographic information system that served as a milestone in the development of integrated mapping systems. The Laboratory influenced numerous computer graphic, mapping and architectural systems such as Intergraph, Computervision, and Esri.

== Founding ==
In 1963, during a training session held at Northwestern University, Chicago architect Howard T. Fisher encountered computer maps on urban planning and civil engineering produced by Edgar Horwood's group at the University of Washington. Fisher conceived a computer mapping software program, SYMAP (Synergistic Mapping), to produce conformant, proximal, and contour maps on a line printer. Fisher applied for a Ford Foundation grant to explore thematic mapping based on early SYMAP outputs, which was awarded in 1965. In association with Harvard providing facilities in Robinson Hall in Harvard Yard as part of the Graduate School of Design, the Ford Foundation provided $294,000 over three years to seed the Harvard Laboratory for Computer Graphics. Working with programmer Betty Benson, Fisher completed SYMAP for distribution in 1966. Also under Fisher's direction, SYMVU and GRID programs were developed. A 1968 reorganisation followed Fisher reaching Harvard's mandatory retirement age and led to renaming as the Harvard Laboratory for Computer Graphics and Spatial Analysis. From 1972, the Laboratory was based in Graduate School's newly built Gund Hall.

The Laboratory's original and continuing goals were:

1. To design and develop computer software for the analysis and graphic display of spatial data.
2. To distribute the resulting software to governmental agencies, educational organizations and interested professionals.
3. To conduct research concerning the definition and analysis of spatial structure and process."

== Major research outputs ==
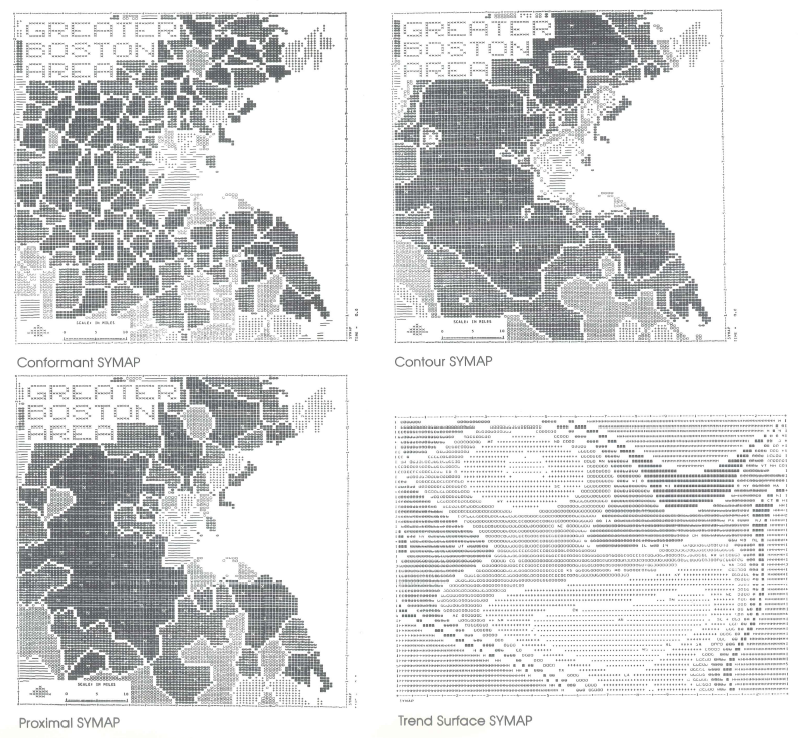
SYMAP - comparison of conformant, contour, proximal, and trend surface outputs

SYMAP's ability to print cheap, albeit low quality, maps using readily available technology led to rapid adoption in the late 1960s. SYMVU software, developed in 1969 to illustrate surface displays, was another popular product. GRID, CALFORM, and POLYVRT products further explored the raster versus vector approach to mapping. The Laboratory gained a reputation for solid output leading to several commercially successful projects and significant budgetary independence for a research institute. Some struggles with restructuring Geographic Base Files - Dual Independent Map Encoding (GBF-DIME files, an early vector and polygonal data structure) for the Census Bureau's Urban Atlas in 1975 inspired the Laboratory to develop an integrated suite of programs beneath by a common user interface and common data manipulation software. In 1978 this suite became the Odyssey project. The Odyssey project's aim was to produce a vector GIS that provided spatial analysis of many different forms within a single system.

As of 1980, in addition to early Odyssey modules, the Laboratory sold the following programs for display and analysis of spatial data

- ASPEX - 3d data perspectives;
- CALFORM - shaded vector maps;
- DOT.MAP - contour, shaded, and dot-distribution maps from gridded data;
- KWIC - key-word-in-context programs for indexing bibliographic references;
- POLYVRT - data conversion and analysis of polygonal data;
- SYMAP - line printer mapping producing conformant (areas), contour, trend surface, and proximal (also known as Voronoi diagram or Thiessan polygonal)
- GIMMS (Geographic Information Management and Mapping System) - a general purpose mapping system written by Tom Waugh at the University of Edinburgh;
- MDS(X) - a multidimensional pattern detection and scaling system under the direction of Tony Coxon at the University of Cardiff.

The 1982 release of Odyssey included seven programs for geographical analysis: Like most of the Laboratory's software, it was written in FORTRAN and operated on several platforms. The POLYPS and PRISM modules could draw maps on a variety of vector display devices.

- PROTEUS - editing, projections, generalization, aggregation, simple display;
- CYCLONE - topological checking of nodes, error correction;
- CYCLOPS - topological checking of polygons, produce graphics shape files;
- WHIRLPOOL - planar enforcement: overlay, error detection of input;
- CALYPSO - attribute manipulations (areal interpolation);
- POLYPS - planar choropleth maps;
- PRISM - raised 3d prism maps.

== Activities ==
The Laboratory distributed software, and later data, at cost, thus encouraging experimentation. The Laboratory conducted correspondence courses, hosted numerous conferences, and worked on environmental planning and architectural projects with the Harvard Graduate School of Design. From 1978 to 1983, the Laboratory hosted a popular annual Harvard Computer Graphics Week. Geoffrey Dutton, a research associate at the Laboratory from 1969 through 1984, created the first holographic thematic map, "America Graph Fleeting" in 1978. This rotating strip of 3,000 holograms depicted an animated sequence of 3d maps showing US population growth from 1790 to 1970, generated by the Laboratory's ASPEX program. Dutton also contributed the program DOT.MAP to the Laboratory's family of distributed software (1977). In 1977 James Dougenik, Duane Niemeyer, and Nicholas Chrisman developed contiguous area cartograms. Bruce Donald, working at the Laboratory from 1978 to 1984, wrote BUILDER, a program for computer-aided architecture. BUILDER produced plan and shaded perspectives that popularised computer-aided-design in architecture. Donald also wrote the CALYPSO module for the commercial Odyssey project and worked on the GLIB/LINGUIST table-driven language system in collaboration with Nick Chrisman and Jim Dougenik, which was based on automata theory and dynamic scoping. GLIB/LINGUIST provided an English-like user interface for Odyssey, BUILDER, and other HLCG software.

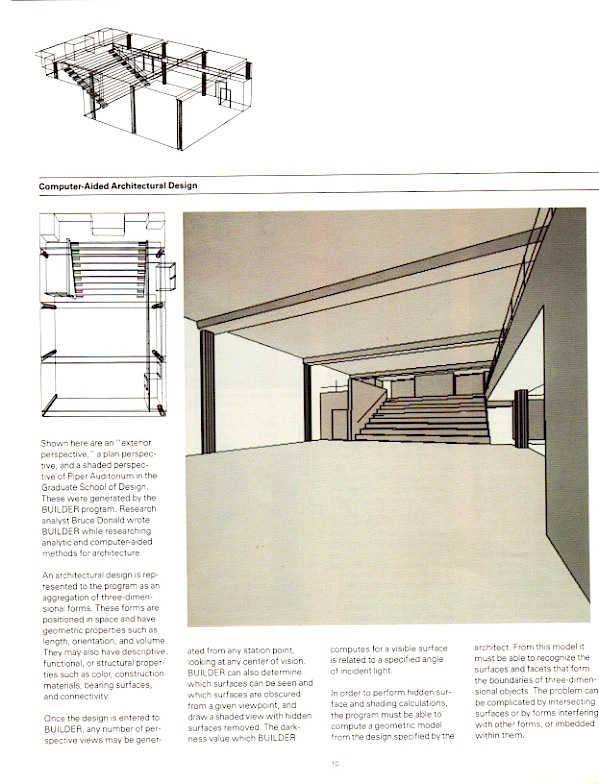
Computer-Aided Architectural Design. A description of Harvard Lab for Computer Graphics (HLCG) research in Context, a publication of the Harvard Graduate School of Design. (Model and rendering by the BUILDER program, 1982).

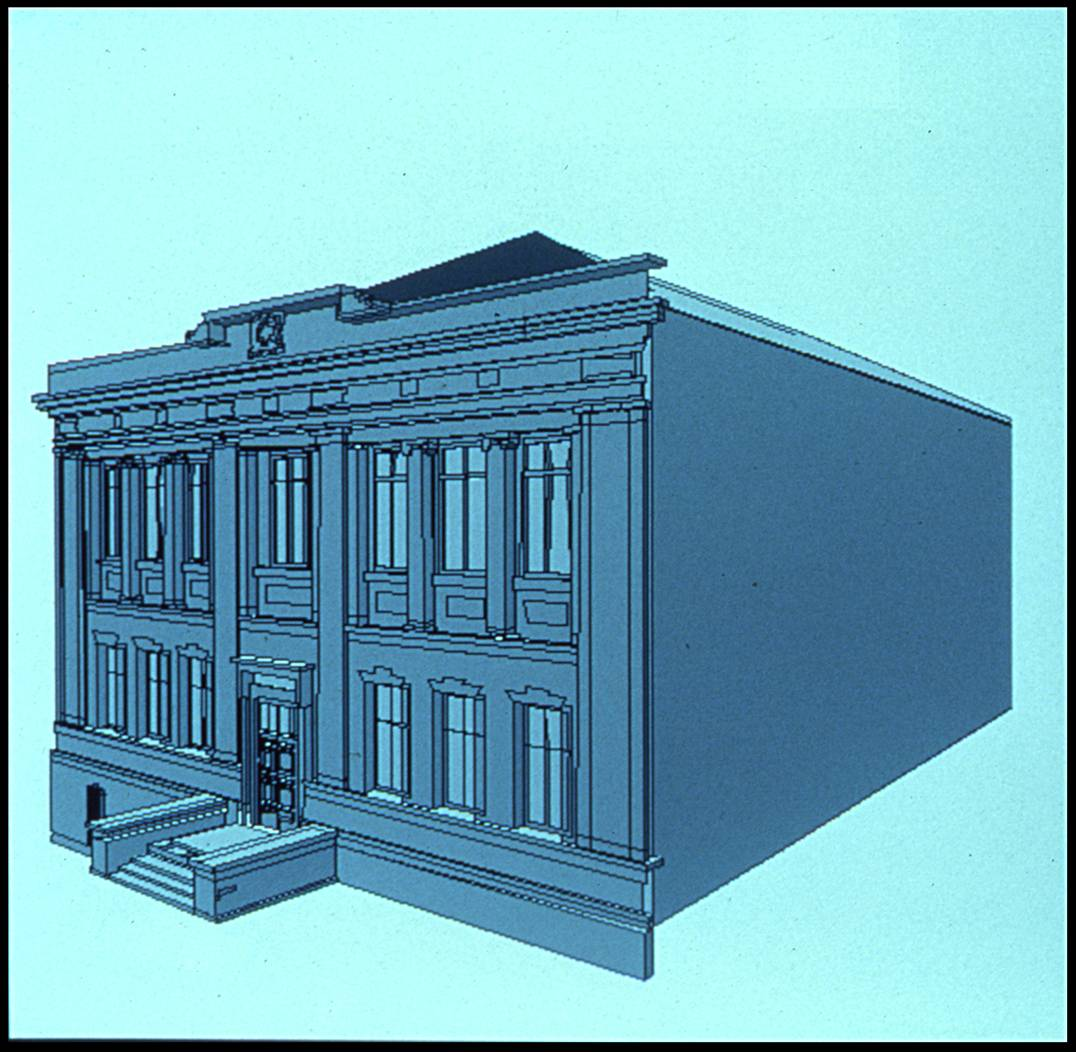
Robinson Hall in Harvard Yard was the home of the Graduate School of Design before the construction of Gund Hall. It now houses the History Department. (Model and rendering by the BUILDER program, 1982).

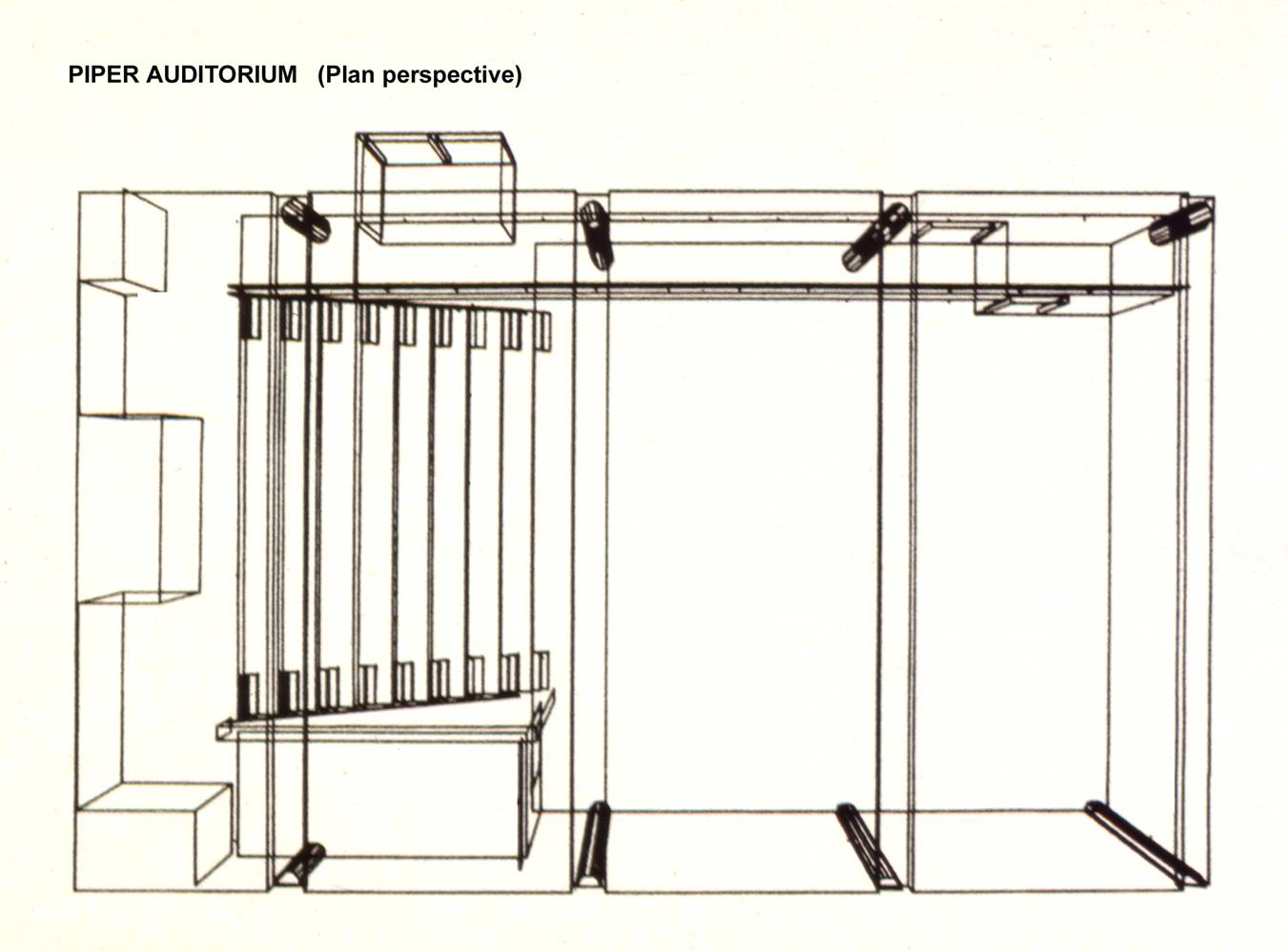
Plan perspective rendering of Piper Auditorium, Gund Hall, GSD. (Model and rendering by the BUILDER program, 1982).

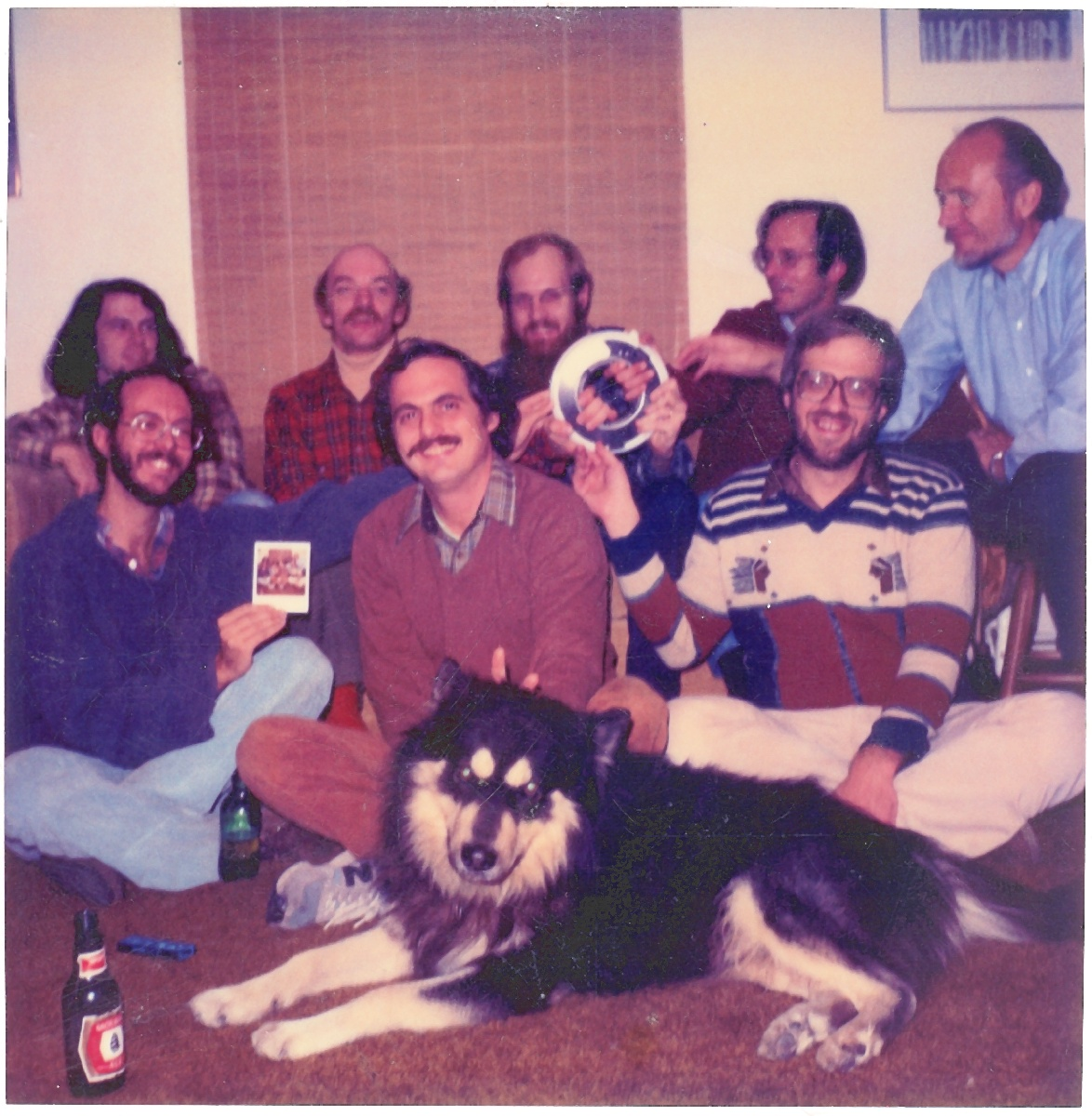
Some of the Odyssey Team (c. 1981, Left to right): Jim Dougenik, Bruce Donald, Tom Digennaro, Geoffrey Dutton, Scott Morehouse, Martin Broekhuysen, Duane Niemeyer, and Allan Schmidt.

The early period of the Laboratory saw staff numbers grow to approximately 40 in 1970, but shrink to half a dozen by 1972 as grants expired. The Odyssey project grew the Laboratory from about 12 people in 1977 to forty people by 1981. The Laboratory shrank significantly back to approximately half a dozen people from 1982 until its closure in June 1991.

== Later period and influence ==
From 1979 the Laboratory was encouraged to develop external software sales and entered into licensing agreements for this purpose, most notably with Synercom and ISSCO Corporation (sold to Computer Associates in 1987) for Odyssey. However, the licensing agreements had weak to non-existent technology exploitation and non-compete clauses, so potential purchasers were frustrated in attempting to license from a competitor often preferentially positioning its proprietary software. Potential purchasers often redeveloped Odyssey functions rather than wait for licenses. Meanwhile, having carved out the potential commercial interests, from 1981 the Harvard Graduate School of Design sought less commercial work and an increased focus on research, though with reduced budgets. "But the timing of this burgeoning commercialism of the Lab's activities collided with the moment in history when Harvard's President Derek Bok set out to clarify the blurred lines between academic research and development on the one hand, and more clearly defined commercial activities on the other." Financial strain and the lack of commercial inspiration for projects led to the dispersal of many team members from 1981. Despite some further research during the late 1980s, the Laboratory closed in 1991.

Odyssey became the template for subsequent GIS software, cited as an inspiration by numerous commercial efforts in mapping and architecture, such as M&S Computing (later Intergraph), Computervision, and Geodat. The Laboratory was an enormous influence on the commercial Environmental Systems Research Institute, Esri, founded in 1969 by Jack Dangermond, a landscape architect graduate of Harvard Graduate School of Design who had worked as a research assistant at the Laboratory during 1968 and 1969. Scott Morehouse, the development lead for the Odyssey project, worked at the lab from 1977 to 1981. When revenues from Odyssey did not meet expectations, his team's resources started to dwindle, and Morehouse left to join Jack at Esri to build a next-generation GIS platform that was to be ArcInfo. Scott's intimate knowledge of the Odyssey geoprocessing model and code base, combined with Jack's insights into how to put the 'IS' in 'GIS' evolved the Laboratory's GIS prototype processors into a system that could effectively and interactively manage, process, edit, and display vector geodata and its scalar attributes that addressed evolving market needs for more robust GIS capabilities.
