= Look Homeward: A Life of Thomas Wolfe =

Pulitzer winning 1988 biography

- First edition
- Author: David Herbert Donald
- Language: English
- Subject: Biography
- Published: 1987
- Publisher: Little, Brown
- Publication place: United States
- ISBN: 9780316189521
- OCLC: 925224109

Look Homeward: A Life of Thomas Wolfe is a 1987 biography of Thomas Wolfe by David Herbert Donald. It won the 1988 Pulitzer Prize in Biography.

Harold Bloom called the book the definitive biography of Wolfe. Library Journal called the book the most successful of Wolfe's three major biographies to that date (it had been preceded by books by Wolfe's agent Elizabeth Nowell (1960) and by Andrew Turnbull (1967), both titled Thomas Wolfe: A Biography; other biographies have been published since). Publishers Weekly wrote that Donald documented Wolfe's life and work "[m]ore fully than any previous biographer." Leslie Field wrote that Donald writes of Wolfe in "incisive, graceful, and forceful style" and has many advantages that Wolfe's earlier biographers did not, including access to material, letters, and papers that had not been available before.

Look Homeward: A Life of Thomas Wolfe is not particularly kind to Wolfe's editors. Donald is hostile to Maxwell Perkins' editing, feeling that Wolfe and Perkins did not have compatible visions and that Perkins was more concerned with producing a best seller than a transcendent work of art. Donald excoriates Edward Aswell even more, accusing him of butchery: "Greatly exceeding the professional responsibility of an editor, Aswell took impermissible liberties with Wolfe's manuscript, and his interference seriously eroded the integrity of Wolfe's text. Far from deserving commendation, Aswell's editorial interference was, both from the standpoint of literature and of ethics, unacceptable". (Harold Bloom demurred, writing that "Mr. Donald, an admirable biographer and skilled historian, ought to have avoided writing literary criticism of Wolfe" since Wolfe's prose is "less tiresomely obtrusive after being worked over by Aswell".)
