= Jacqui Banaszynski =

American journalist

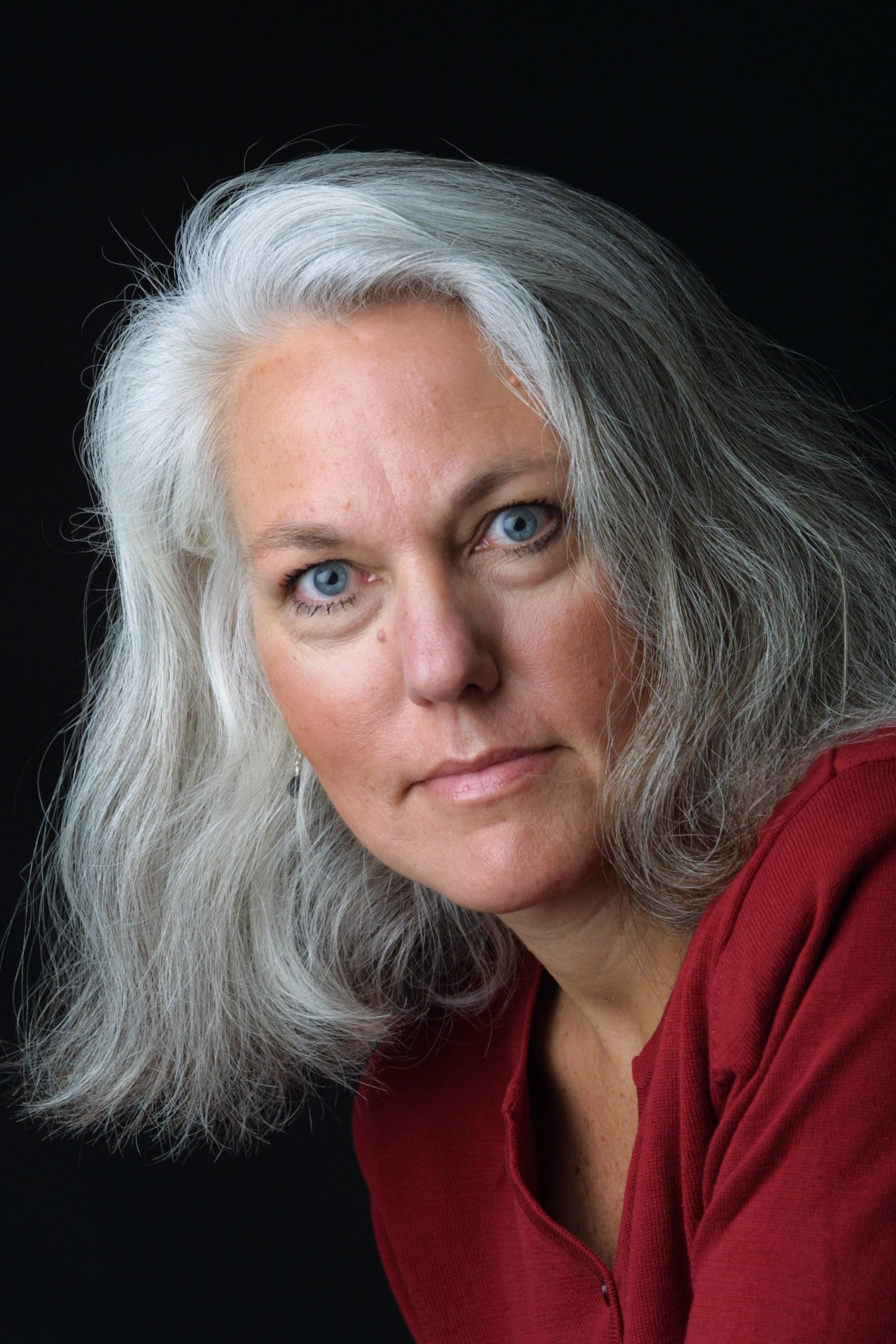
- Banaszynski in 2011
- Born: Jacqueline Marie Banaszynski; April 17, 1952 (age 74); Pulaski, Wisconsin, United States
- Occupation: Journalist
- Known for: "The Trail of Tears" (1986 Internat. Pulitzer finalist); "AIDS in the Heartland" (1988 Feature Pulitzer); Knight Chair, Missouri School of Journalism

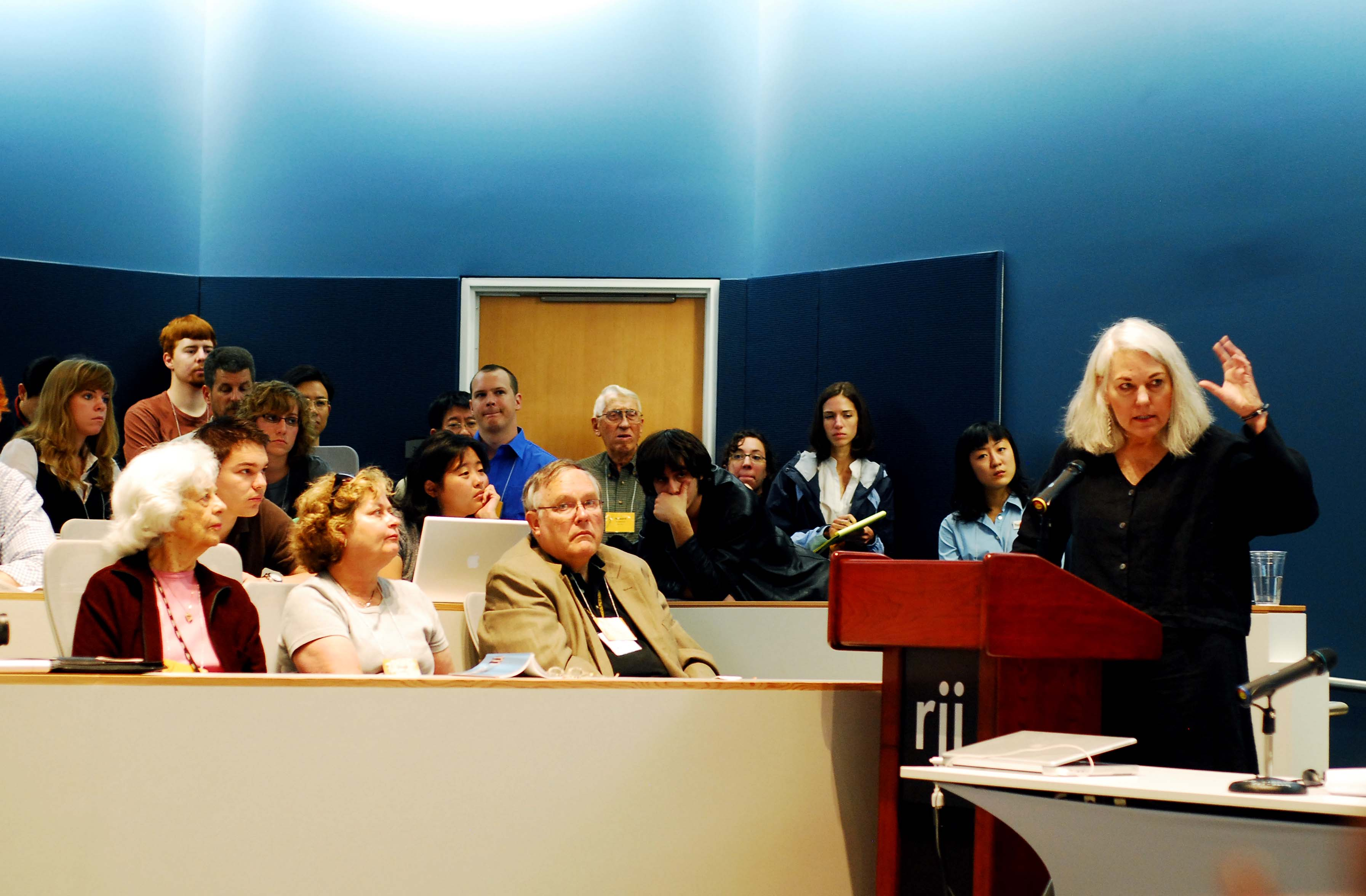
Jacqui Banaszynski speaking at the Missouri School of Journalism in 2008

Jacqueline Marie Banaszynski (born April 17, 1952) is an American journalist. She was the winner of the Pulitzer Prize for Feature Writing in 1988. Banaszynski went on to become a professor and a John S. and James L. Knight Foundation Chair at the school of journalism at University of Missouri.

== Biography ==
Born in Pulaski, Wisconsin, Banaszynski began working as a journalist in high school and when she was 15, became the associate editor of the school paper, the Pulaski News. Part of the appeal of working on the paper was that the journalism program gave her access to sporting events at the school level. Banaszynski graduated from Pulaski High School in 1970 and earned a degree in journalism from Marquette University in 1974., graduating magna cum laude.

Around 1984, Banaszynski started working for the St. Paul Pioneer Press Dispatch. In 1985, she went on assignment to Africa and her story about Sudanese victims of famine, "The Trail of Tears," became a finalist for the Pulitzer Prize for International Reporting in 1986.

Banaszynski wrote a special report called "AIDS in the Heartland" while she was a reporter at the St. Paul Pioneer Press Dispatch. The report was a series of stories that centered around the lives of two gay Minnesota farmers, Both had contracted and died of AIDS . She and photographer Jean Pieri searched for a year for subjects that they felt could "humanize people afflicted by this terrifying new illness." Their choice of following Dick Hanson and his partner, Bert Henningson, at first upset readers of the newspaper, but after the final installment of the 3 part series, most readers seemed to sympathize with both men. The series won a Pulitzer Prize for Feature Writing in 1988.

In 1997, Banaszynski began working for The Seattle Times and in 2003, became the Associate Managing Editor for special projects and staff development.

Banaszynski was inducted into the American Society of Sunday and Feature Editors Hall of Fame in 2008. She went on to become the Knight Chair at the University of Missouri School of Journalism.
