= Pulaski, Wisconsin =

- Village
- Nickname: Polka Capital of the World!
- Location of Pulaski in Brown County, Wisconsin.
- Coordinates: 44°40′08″N 88°14′43″W
- Country: United States
- State: Wisconsin
- Counties: Brown, Shawano, Oconto

Area
  - Total: 2.88 sq mi (7.45 km^{2})
  - Land: 2.84 sq mi (7.35 km^{2})
  - Water: 0.039 sq mi (0.10 km^{2})
- Elevation: 804 ft (245 m)

Population (2020)
  - Total: 3,870
  - Density: 1,360/sq mi (527/km^{2})
- Time zone: UTC-6 (Central (CST))
  - Summer (DST): UTC-5 (CDT)
- Area code: 920
- FIPS code: 55-65675
- GNIS feature ID: 1583988
- Website: villageofpulaski.org

Pulaski (/pəˈlæski/ pə-LASS-kee) is a village in Brown, Oconto, and Shawano counties in the U.S. state of Wisconsin. The population was 3,870 at the 2020 census. Of this, 3,650 were in Brown County, 220 in Shawano County, and none in Oconto County.

The Brown and Oconto County portions of Pulaski are part of the Green Bay metropolitan area.

== History ==
The village was named after the Polish Revolutionary War general Casimir Pulaski, who was responsible for creating America's first cavalry.

== Geography ==
According to the United States Census Bureau, the village has a total area of 2.77 square miles (7.17 km^{2}), of which 2.73 square miles (7.07 km^{2}) is land and 0.04 square miles (0.10 km^{2}) is water. Most of the village is located in Brown County, with only small portions extending north into Oconto County and west into Shawano County.

== Climate ==
Pulaski

Climate chart (precipitation, max. and min. temperature)
J	F	M	A	M	J	J	A	S	O	N	D
64 −9 −13	72 −7 −13	82 −1 −10	109 15 1	106 20 6	111 24 14	101 26 15	113 24 15	88 22 11	118 12 5	83 3 −3	56 −5 −11
- █ Average max. and min. temperatures in °C
- █ Precipitation totals in mm
Imperial conversion
J	F	M	A	M	J	J	A	S	O	N	D
2.5 16 9	2.8 19 9	3.2 30 14	4.3 59 34	4.2 68 43	4.4 75 57	4 79 59	4.4 75 59	3.5 72 52	4.6 54 41	3.3 37 27	2.2 23 12
- █ Average max. and min. temperatures in °F
- █ Precipitation totals in inches

== Demographics ==
Historical population
Census	Pop.	Note	%±
1910	436		—
1920	718		64.7%
1930	839		16.9%
1940	979		16.7%
1950	1,210		23.6%
1960	1,540		27.3%
1970	1,717		11.5%
1980	1,875		9.2%
1990	2,200		17.3%
2000	3,060		39.1%
2010	3,539		15.7%
2020	3,870		9.4%
U.S. Decennial Census

=== 2010 census ===
As of the census of 2010, there were 3,539 people, 1,418 households, and 934 families living in the village. The population density was 1,296.3 inhabitants per square mile (500.5/km^{2}). There were 1,525 housing units at an average density of 558.6 per square mile (215.7/km^{2}). The racial makeup of the village was 96.0% White, 0.3% African American, 1.2% Native American, 0.5% Asian, 0.7% from other races, and 1.3% from two or more races. Hispanic or Latino of any race were 1.9% of the population.

There were 1,418 households, of which 38.6% had children under the age of 18 living with them, 46.2% were married couples living together, 14.2% had a female householder with no husband present, 5.4% had a male householder with no wife present, and 34.1% were non-families. 29.5% of all households were made up of individuals, and 12.2% had someone living alone who was 65 years of age or older. The average household size was 2.46 and the average family size was 3.07.

The median age in the village was 33.6 years. 28.8% of residents were under the age of 18; 8.7% were between the ages of 18 and 24; 27.6% were from 25 to 44; 22.2% were from 45 to 64; and 12.6% were 65 years of age or older. The gender makeup of the village was 48.4% male and 51.6% female.

=== 2000 census ===
As of the census of 2000, there were 3,060 people, 1,185 households, and 795 families living in the village. The population density was 1,225.4 people per square mile (472.6/km^{2}). There were 1,254 housing units at an average density of 502.2 per square mile (193.7/km^{2}). The racial makeup of the village was 97.35% White, 0.33% African American, 0.69% Native American, 0.72% Asian, 0.16% from other races, and 0.75% from two or more races. Hispanic or Latino of any race were 0.95% of the population.

There were 1,185 households, out of which 35.8% had children under the age of 18 living with them, 53.2% were married couples living together, 10.5% had a female householder with no husband present, and 32.9% were non-families. 27.4% of all households were made up of individuals, and 13.3% had someone living alone who was 65 years of age or older. The average household size was 2.55 and the average family size was 3.16.

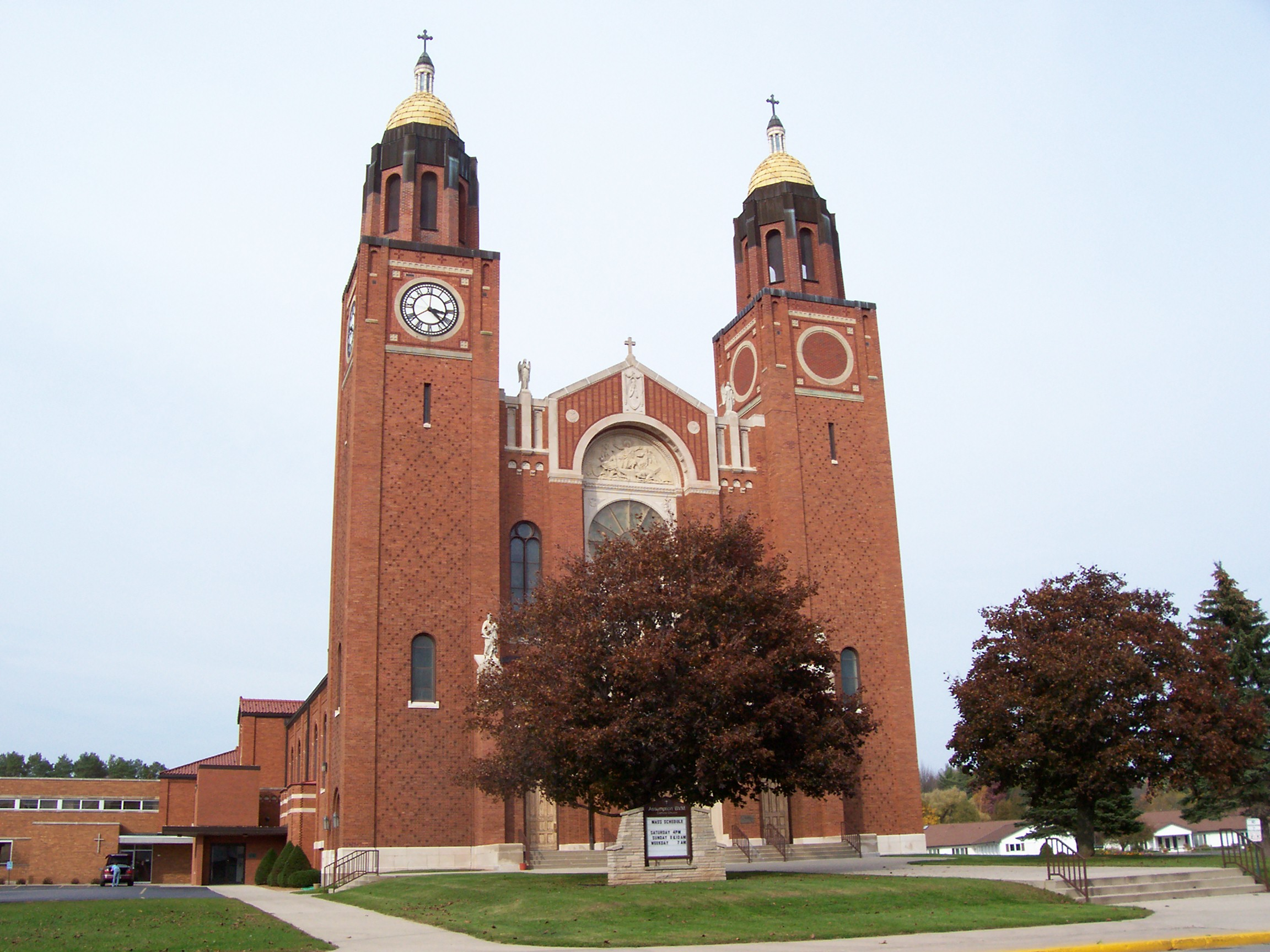
Assumption BVM Church

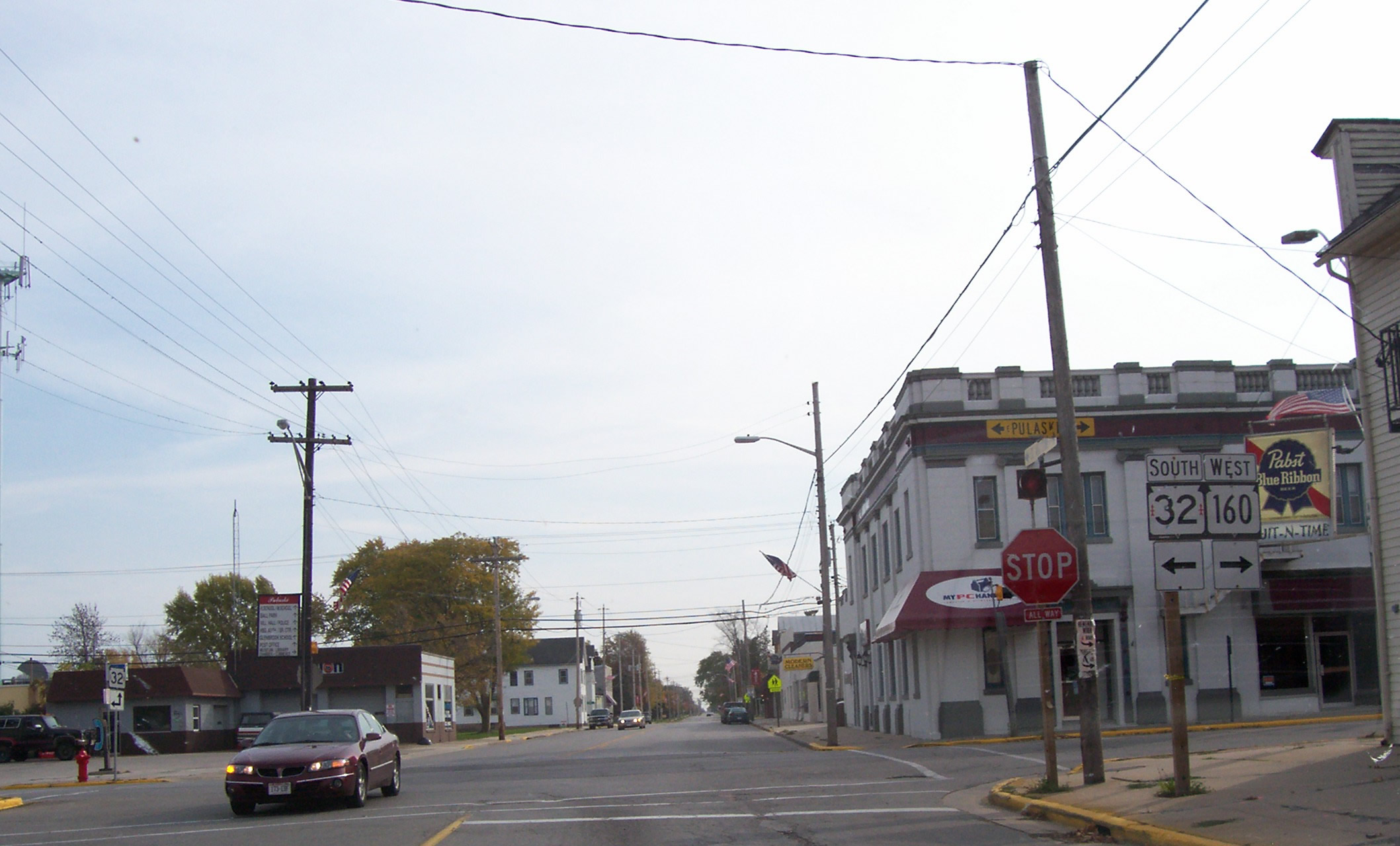
Highways in Pulaski

In the village, the population was spread out, with 28.2% under the age of 18, 10.7% from 18 to 24, 30.6% from 25 to 44, 16.7% from 45 to 64, and 13.9% who were 65 years of age or older. The median age was 34 years. For every 100 females, there were 100.1 males. For every 100 females age 18 and over, there were 94.0 males.

The median income for a household in the village was $43,017, and the median income for a family was $53,281. Males had a median income of $34,811 versus $25,101 for females. The per capita income for the village was $18,711. About 5.5% of families and 6.9% of the population were below the poverty line, including 5.7% of those under age 18 and 14.6% of those age 65 or over.

== Media ==
- Pulaski News

== Recreation ==
Pulaski is host to the annual "Pulaski Polka Days", one of the largest festivals dedicated to the Polish in the United States. The festival draws polka bands from around the country. It closes with a Polka Day parade and traditional Polish Catholic Mass.

== Notable people ==
- Gary Drzewiecki, businessman
- Deedra Irwin, biathlete
- Harry Rozmiarek, veterinarian
- Jacqui Banaszynski, journalist
