= David Herbert Donald =

American historian (1920–2009)

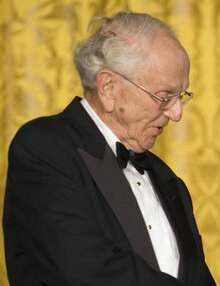
- Born: October 1, 1920; Goodman, Mississippi, U.S.
- Died: May 17, 2009 (aged 88); Boston, Massachusetts, U.S.
- Education: Millsaps College; University of Illinois
- Occupation: Historian
- Known for: Biography of Abraham Lincoln
- Awards: Pulitzer Prize for Biography (1961, 1988)

David Herbert Donald (October 1, 1920 – May 17, 2009) was an American historian, best known for his 1995 biography of Abraham Lincoln. He twice won the Pulitzer Prize for Biography, for books about Thomas Wolfe and Charles Sumner; he published more than 30 books on United States political and literary figures and the history of the American South.

== Early life and education ==
David Herbert Donald was born in Goodman, Mississippi, a town in the center of Holmes County. The county's western border is formed by the Yazoo River and it is part of the Mississippi-Yazoo Delta. Donald's father was a farmer, while his mother was a teacher.

Majoring in history and sociology, Donald earned his bachelor's degree from Millsaps College in Jackson, Mississippi. After earning a master's degree in history (1942) at the University of Illinois at Urbana-Champaign, he earned his PhD in 1946 under James G. Randall at the same institution. Randall as a mentor influenced Donald's life and career. He encouraged his protégé to write his dissertation on Abraham Lincoln's law partner, William Herndon. Donald adapted and published the dissertation as his first book, Lincoln's Herndon (1948).

== Career ==
After completing his doctorate, Donald taught at Columbia University, Johns Hopkins University and, from 1973 until his retirement in 1991, Harvard University. He also taught at Smith College, the University of North Wales (on a Fulbright grant), Princeton University, University College London and served as Harmsworth Professor of American History at Oxford University (1959–60). At Johns Hopkins, Columbia, and Harvard he trained dozens of graduate students, including Heather Cox Richardson, Jean H. Baker, William J. Cooper Jr., Michael Holt, Irwin Unger, Ari Hoogenboom, and Richard R. John.

Donald's term as president of the Southern Historical Association began in 1969. He also served on the editorial board for the Papers of Abraham Lincoln.

Donald was the Charles Warren Professor of American History (emeritus from 1991) at Harvard University. He wrote more than thirty books, including well-received biographies of Abraham Lincoln, Thomas Wolfe and Charles Sumner. He specialized in the American Civil War and Reconstruction periods, and in the history of the American South.

== Legacy and honors ==
Donald received the Pulitzer Prize for Biography or Autobiography twice, in 1961 for Charles Sumner and the Coming of the Civil War and in 1988 for Look Homeward: A Life of Thomas Wolfe. He also received several honorary degrees.

Donald received the American Academy of Achievement's Golden Plate Award in 1997.

Donald was inducted as a Laureate of The Lincoln Academy of Illinois and awarded the Order of Lincoln (the State's highest honor) by the Governor of Illinois in 2008 in the area of Communications and Education.

In 2000, Donald received The Lincoln Forum's Richard Nelson Current Award of Achievement.

== Personal life and death ==
Donald married Aida DiPace in 1955, and their son, Bruce Randall Donald, who became a computer scientist, was born in 1958. Donald lived in Lincoln, Massachusetts, with his wife, who was a historian and author, and a senior editor and then editor-in-chief at the Harvard University Press. He died of heart failure in Boston on May 17, 2009.

== Works ==
In his introduction to Donald's first book, Lincoln's Herndon, a biography of Lincoln's law partner, the poet and Lincoln biographer Carl Sandburg called it the answer to scholars' prayers: "When is someone going to do the life of Bill Herndon. Isn't it about time? Now the question is out."

David M. Potter, a Civil War scholar, said that Donald's biography of Charles Sumner portrayed "Sumner as a man with acute psychological inadequacies" and exposed Sumner's "facade of pompous rectitude." Donald's evenhanded approach to Sumner, Potter concluded, was a model for biographers working with a difficult subject. "If it does not make Sumner attractive [the book] certainly makes him understandable."

Donald's biography of Lincoln "is often considered the best single-volume biography of Lincoln ever." Historian Eric Foner said of it "It is the most balanced of the biographies out there. It is not a work of hero worship, nor does it have a prosecutorial brief. He presents Lincoln as a rather passive figure, not at all in charge of the forces raging around him, which is quite accurate."

- Lincoln's Herndon (1948)
- Divided We Fought: A Pictorial History of the War, 1861—1865 (1952)
- Editor, Inside Lincoln's Cabinet: The Civil War Diaries of Salmon P. Chase (1954)
- Lincoln Reconsidered: Essays on the Civil War Era (1956, 2nd ed., 1961, 3rd ed., 2001) Previously published essays. (ISBN 978-0-679-72310-3).
- Charles Sumner and the Coming of the Civil War (1961). Pulitzer Prize-winning scholarly biography to 1860.
- The Civil War and Reconstruction (1961; 2001) (ISBN 978-0-393-97427-0), 2001 edition with Jean H. Baker and Michael F. Holt; 1961 ed. with James G. Randall.
- Editor, Why the North Won the Civil War (1962) (ISBN 978-0-02-031660-2) (revised ed. 1996).
- Editor with Aida DiPace Donald, Diary of Charles Francis Adams, Volumes 1 and 2, January 1820 - September 1829 (1964), Harvard University Press.
- The Politics of Reconstruction, 1863-1867 (1965)
- Charles Sumner and the Rights of Man (1970). Biography after 1860.
- Look Homeward: A Life of Thomas Wolfe (1987). Winner of the Pulitzer Prize for Biography. (ISBN 978-0-316-18952-1).
- Lincoln (1995) ISBN 978-0-684-80846-8
- Lincoln at Home: Two Glimpses of Abraham Lincoln's Domestic Life (1999) ISBN 978-0-912308-77-7.
- We Are Lincoln Men: Abraham Lincoln and His Friends (2003) (ISBN 978-0-7432-5468-7).
