= Barrow Area Information Database =

Arctic database

The Barrow Area Information Database (BAID) is designed to support Arctic science with a special focus on the research hubs of Barrow, Atqasuk, and Ivotuk on the North Slope of Alaska.

The BAID Internet Map Server (BAID-IMS) is freely available to scientists, land managers, educators and the local community. Users can navigate to areas of interest and explore or query information about field-based scientific research. Current and historic research sites are shown as points with links to details about project investigators, discipline, funding program, year, related web sites, site photos and other information. Users can print or export maps for presentations and export tabular information.

BAID-IMS currently includes the locations of over 7000 research plots and instrument locations. This ongoing effort incorporates both new research locations and sampling sites dating back to the 1940s. BAID-IMS includes satellite imagery and other remote sensing products, topographic maps, land ownership information and local infrastructure that facilitates research and science communication.

== History ==
The Barrow Area Information Database (BAID) was initiated in June 2000 as a cooperative project between Michigan State University's Arctic Ecology Laboratory and the Barrow Arctic Science Consortium (BASC). The project had humble beginnings as a Microsoft Access database which was used to centralize information about research plots mapped with BASC's new DGPS system. In 2003, BASC's Digital Subcommittee saw an opportunity to visualize the BAID database with Internet Map Server (IMS) technology and commonly requested base maps. The BAID-IMS prototype was soon released. On September 1, 2005 NSF awarded funding for the project to continue through August 30, 2009.

BAID-IMS currently includes the locations of over 7000 research plots and instrument locations. This ongoing effort incorporates both new research locations and sampling sites dating back to the 1940s.

In order to facilitate the documentation of field research sites in the Barrow area, the University of Texas at El Paso Systems Ecology Laboratory provides Differential GPS support to National Science Foundation researchers during the peak Summer field season (June 1 - August 15). Support for historical studies and for other agencies working the vicinity of the Barrow Environmental Observatory also provided.

== Capabilities ==
BAID-IMS can be used to mine information about research locations, project descriptions, photographs and contact information.

Metadata that meets the standards of the Federal Geographic Data Committee (FGDC) is available (or under development) for many data layers in BAID-IMS. Data that is considered unrestricted can be downloaded at the Arctic System Science (ARCSS) Data Coordination Center (ADCC) at the National Snow and Ice Data Center (NSIDC) located at University of Colorado at Boulder.

BAID-IMS is linked to the Circumarctic Environmental Observatories Network and efforts to develop an Arctic Spatial Data Infrastructure.

== Technical details ==
BAID-IMS is hosted at the University of Texas at El Paso (UTEP). The application was designed with ESRI's ArcIMS 9.2 software. BAID-IMS currently integrates geospatial data from SDE databases, shapefiles, GeoTiffs and ERDAS Imagine files. Testing is underway to migrate the application to an ArcGIS Server Web Mapping Application. Dell blade server technology is employed to host the IMS application and associated database. Bulk purchases agreements and educational discounts available to UTEP have been leveraged in the acquisition of computer hardware, software, mapping grade GPS units and digital cameras in support of this effort. Support for Open Geospatial Consortium (OGC) standards are enhanced with each upgrade to the application. An OGC Web Mapping Service (WMS) and a KML for use in Virtual Globes, such as Google Earth are also planned for release in 2008.
