= GIS in geospatial intelligence =

Geographic information systems (GIS) play a constantly evolving role in geospatial intelligence (GEOINT) and United States national security. These technologies allow a user to efficiently manage, analyze, and produce geospatial data, to combine GEOINT with other forms of intelligence collection, and to perform highly developed analysis and visual production of geospatial data. Therefore, GIS produces up-to-date and more reliable GEOINT to reduce uncertainty for a decisionmaker. Since GIS programs are Web-enabled, a user can constantly work with a decision maker to solve their GEOINT and national security related problems from anywhere in the world. There are many types of GIS software used in GEOINT and national security, such as Google Earth, ERDAS IMAGINE, GeoNetwork opensource, and Esri ArcGIS.

== Background ==
=== Geographic information systems (GIS) ===
A GIS is a system that incorporates software, hardware, and data for collecting, managing, analyzing, and portraying geographically referenced information. It allows the user to view, understand, manipulate, manifest, and visualize data to reveal relationships and patterns that solve problems. The user can then present the data in easily understood and disseminated forms, such as maps, reports, or charts.

A user can enter different kinds of data in map form into a GIS to begin their analysis, such as United States Geological Survey (USGS) digital line graph data, contour lines, elevation maps, topographic maps, geological maps, and satellite imagery. A user can also convert digital information into forms that a GIS can identify and utilize, such as census tabular data or Microsoft Excell files. Users can easily capture digital data in a GIS. If the data is not digital, then users will need to employ various techniques to capture the data, such as digitizing maps by hand-tracing with a computer mouse, utilizing a digitizing tablet to collect feature coordinates, using electronic scanners, or uploading Global Positioning System (GPS) coordinates.

GIS applies to the geographical facets of various aspects of everyday life, such as transportation, logistics, medicine, marketing, sociology, ecology, pure and applied sciences, emergency management, big men, and criminology. GIS is also utilized in all three areas of intelligence: national security intelligence, law enforcement intelligence, and competitive intelligence

=== Geospatial intelligence (GEOINT) ===
GEOINT, known previously as imagery intelligence (IMINT), is an intelligence collection discipline that applies to national security intelligence, law enforcement intelligence, and competitive intelligence. For example, an analyst can use GEOINT to identify the route of least resistance for a military force in a hostile country, to discover a pattern in the locations of reported burglaries in a neighborhood, or to generate a map and comparison of failing businesses that a company is likely to purchase. GEOINT is also the geospatial product of a process that is focused externally, designed to reduce the level of uncertainty for a decisionmaker, and that uses information derived from all sources. The National Geospatial-Intelligence Agency (NGA), who has overall responsibility for GEOINT in the U.S. Intelligence Community (IC), defines GEOINT as "information about any object—natural or man---made—that can be observed or referenced to the Earth, and has national security implications."

Some of the sources of collected imagery information for GEOINT are imagery satellites, cameras on airplanes, Unmanned Aerial Vehicles (UAV) and drones, handheld cameras, maps, or GPS coordinates. Recently the NGA and IC have increased the use of commercial satellite imagery for intelligence support, such as the use of the IKONOS, Landsat, or SPOT satellites. These sources produce digital imagery via electro-optical systems, radar, infrared, visible light, multispectral, or hyperspectral imageries.

The disadvantages of GEOINT are that imagery is easily consumable and understood by a decisionmaker, has low human life risk, displays the capabilities of a target and its geographical relationship to other objects, and that analysts can use imagery world-wide in a short time. On the other hand, the advantages of GEOINT are that imagery is only a snapshot of a moment in time, can be too compelling and lead to ill-informed decisions that ignore other intelligence, is static and vulnerable to deception and decoys, does not depict the intentions of a target, and is expensive and subject to environmental problems.

== GIS use in GEOINT and national security intelligence ==
=== Overview ===
A majority of national security intelligence decisions involve geography and GEOINT. GIS allows the user to capture, manage, exploit, analyze, and visualize geographically referenced information, physical features, and other geospatial data. GIS is thus a critical infrastructure for the GEOINT and national security community in manipulating and interpreting spatial knowledge in an information system. GIS extracts real world geographic or other information into datasets, maps, metadata, data models, and workflow models within a geodatabase that is used to solve GEOINT-related problems. GIS provides a structure for map and data production that allows a user to add other data sources, such as satellite or UAV imagery, as new layers to a geodatabase. The geodatabase can be disseminated and operated across any network of associated users (i.e. from the GEOINT analyst to the warfighter) and engenders a common spatial capability for all defense and intelligence domains.

The map and chart production agency and imagery intelligence agency, the principal three agencies of GEOINT, use GIS to efficiently work together to solve decisionmaker's geospatial questions, to communicate effectively between their unique departments, and to provide constantly updated, accurate GEOINT to their national security and warfighter domains.

Another important aspect of GIS is its ability to fuse geospatial data with other forms of intelligence collection, such as signals intelligence (SIGINT), measurement and signature intelligence (MASINT), human intelligence (HUMINT), or open source intelligence (OSINT). A GIS user can incorporate and fuse all of these types of intelligence into applications that provide corroborated GEOINT throughout an organization's information system.

GIS enables efficient management of geospatial data, the fusion of geospatial data with other forms of intelligence collection, and advanced analysis and visual production of geospatial data. This produces faster, corroborated, and more reliable GEOINT that aims to reduce uncertainty for a decisionmaker.

=== Roles ===
- Data and map production
- Data fusion, data discovery through metadata catalogs, and data dissemination through Web portals and browsers
- Analysis and exploitation of collected imagery or intelligence
- SIGINT, GEOINT, MASINT, and other sensor analysis
- Fusion of multiple forms of intelligence collection
- Collaborative planning and efficient workflow management between decisionmakers, analysts, consumers, and warfighters
- Suitability and temporal analysis
- Stewardship: Geospatial intelligence

=== Related Esri Products ===
==== Distributed Geospatial Intelligence Network (DGInet) ====
The DGInet technology allows military and national security intelligence customers to access large multi-terabyte databases through a common Web-based interface. This gives the users the capability to quickly and easily identify, overlay, and fuse georeferenced data from various sources to create maps or support geospatial analysis. Esri designed the technology for inexperienced GIS users of national security intelligence and defense organizations in order to provide a Web-based enterprise solution for publishing, distributing, and exploiting GEOINT data among designated organizations. According to Esri, the DGInet technology "uses thin clients to search massive amounts of geospatial and intelligence data using low-bandwidth Web services for data discovery, dissemination, and horizontal fusion of data and products."

==== PLTS for ArcGIS Specialized Solutions ====
PLTS for ArcGIS Specialized Solutions is a group of software applications that extends ArcGIS to facilitate database driven cartographic production for geospatial and mapping agencies, nautical and aeronautical chart production, foundation mapping, and defense mapping requirements. The collection of software applications includes Esri Production Mapping, Esri Nautical Solution, Esri Aeronautical Solution, and Esri Defense Mapping programs that provide quality control, easier and consistent map production, database sharing, and efficient workflow management for each program's specific type of mapping or charting.

==== Geoprocessing ====
Geoprocessing is based on a framework of data transformation in GIS and is a collection of hundreds of GIS tools that manipulate geospatial or other data in GIS. A geoprocessing tool performs an operation (often the name of the tool, such as "Clip") on an existing GIS dataset and produces a new dataset as a result of the utilized tool. GIS users utilize these tools to create a workflow model that quickly and easily transforms raw data into the desired product.

In GEOINT, users employ geoprocessing in similar ways. They can make geoprocessing tools resemble analytic techniques to transform large amounts of data into actionable information. In national security intelligence and defense organizations, geoprocessing notifies users to events occurring in specific areas of interest and enables domain-specific analysis applications, such as radio frequency analysis, terrain analysis, and network analysis.

==== Tracking Analyst and Tracking Server ====
The ArcGIS Tracking Analyst extension enables the user to create time series visualizations to analyze time and location sensitive information. It creates a visible path from incorporated data that shows movement through space and time. The program allows the national security intelligence or defense user to track assets (such as vehicles or personnel), monitor sensors, visualize change over time, play back events, and analyze historical or real-time temporal data.

The Tracking Server program is an kanye enterprise technology that integrates real-time data with GIS to disseminate information quickly and easily to decisionmakers. This program enables the user to obtain data in any format and transmit it to the necessary consumer or ArcGIS Tracking Analyst user, to conduct filters or alerts on specific attributes of incoming data or global positions, and to log data into ArcGIS Server for efficient project management and information sharing.

When Tracking Server and ArcGIS Tracking Analyst are used together, a user can monitor changes in data as they occur in real-time. A national security intelligence or defense user can subscribe to real-time data over the Internet from GPS and custom data feeds to support GEOINT requirements, such as fleet management or target tracking.

==== ArcGIS Military Analyst ====
The ArcGIS Military Analyst extension incorporates display and analysis tools that allow the use and production of vector and raster products, line-of-sight analysis, hillshade analysis, terrain analysis, and Military Grid Reference System (MGRS) conversion. This program also provides a basis for command, control, and intelligence (C2I) systems. National security intelligence and defense organizations use ArcGIS Military Analyst extension to integrate geospatial data with other defense data, analyze digital terrains, and prepare for battle. This program also enables such users to manage and analyze geospatial data and relationships between mission planning, logistics, and C2I.

==== Military Overlay Editor (MOLE) ====
MOLE is a set of command components that enables national security intelligence and defense users to easily create, display, and edit U.S. Department of Defense MIL-STD-2525B and the North Atlantic Treaty Organization APP-6A military symbology in a map. This allows for easier and faster identification, understanding, and movement of ally and hostile forces on a map by combining GIS spatial analysis techniques with common military symbols. MOLE provides a clearer visualization of mission planning and goals for the decisionmaker, and allows a user to import, locate, and display order of battle databases.

==== Grid Manager ====
Grid Manager enables the national security intelligence or defense user to create accurate, realistic grids that contain geographic location indicators based on specified shapes, scales, coordinate systems, and units. This program allows the user to create multiple grids, graticules, and borders for such map products as MGRS coordinates and tourist, topographic, parcel, street, nautical, and aeronautical maps.

== GIS use in the National Geospatial-Intelligence Agency (NGA) ==
The NGA uses GIS products to create digital nautical, aeronautical, and topographic charts and maps, to perform geotechnical and coordinate system analysis, and to help solve a large variety of national security and military problems. Since the NGA is a U.S. Department of Defense combat support agency and a member of the IC, it uses GIS to produce precise, up-to-date GEOINT for members of the U.S. Armed Forces, the IC, and other government agencies. Web-enabled GIS applications allow for fast, efficient sharing and disseminating of geospatial data, products, and intelligence from the NGA to its allies, warfighters, partners, and other agencies across the World Wide Web. The NGA and Esri have successfully collaborated on providing timely, accurate, and relevant GEOINT in support of U.S. national security for the past 20 years.

The NGA has created a grouping of web-based capabilities called GEOINT Online. This program allows a user to search and access all NGA GEOINT documents from wherever they are stored and from wherever the user is. GEOINT Online provides quick, easy, and reliable access to current NGA intelligence products, changes in activities or regions, information from analyst's blogs and Intellipedia, geospatial imagery, maps and charts, major GIS commercial software packages, and GIS combinations of these products. A user can also edit and format existing NGA/GIS products and maps to create, print, and download new products that fulfill current decisionmaker requirements. Ultimately, this results in the faster production of timely and relevant GEOINT data. This program allowed the NGA to change its focus from simply generating cartographic products to providing updated, accurate GEOINT to support the national security and military requirements of its customers.

== See also ==
- ArcGIS
- ERDAS IMAGINE
- Esri
- Geographic information system
- Geospatial intelligence
- Wikikipedia
- GeoTime
- Google Earth
- Imagery intelligence
- National Geospatial-Intelligence Agency
- National security
- Wikipedia
- Richard Petron
