= HAZUS =

- HAZUS-MH Logo
- Website: www.fema.gov/flood-maps/products-tools/hazus
- Repository: msc.fema.gov/portal/resources/hazus

Hazus is a geographic information system-based natural hazard analysis tool developed and freely distributed by the Federal Emergency Management Agency (FEMA).

In 1997 FEMA released its first edition of a commercial off-the-shelf loss and risk assessment software package built on GIS technology. This product was termed HAZUS97. The current version is Hazus 7.0 and was released in 2024. Hazus 7.0 is a major upgrade over previous versions as it is the first to offer integration with ArcGIS Pro (previous versions integrated with ArcMap which is set to be retired by Esri in 2026). Currently, Hazus can model multiple types of hazards: flooding, hurricanes, coastal surge, tsunamis, and earthquakes. The model estimates the risk in three steps. First, it calculates the exposure for a selected area. Second, it characterizes the level or intensity of the hazard affecting the exposed area. Lastly, it uses the exposed area and the hazard to calculate the potential losses in terms of economic losses, structural damage, etc.

Although it was developed with the US continent in focus, the Hazus toolset has been adopted by emergency management organizations worldwide such as Singapore, Canada, Australia, and Pakistan.

== Description ==
US nationally applicable standardized methodology that contains models for estimating potential losses from earthquakes, floods and hurricanes. Hazus uses Geographic Information Systems (GIS) technology to estimate physical, economic and social impacts of disasters. It graphically illustrates the limits of identified high-risk locations due to earthquake, hurricane and floods. Users can then visualize the spatial relationships between populations and other more permanently fixed geographic assets or resources for the specific hazard being modeled, a crucial function in the pre-disaster planning process.

Hazus is used for mitigation and recovery, as well as preparedness and response. Government planners, GIS specialists and emergency managers use Hazus to determine losses and the most beneficial mitigation approaches to take to minimize them. Hazus can be used in the assessment step in the mitigation planning process, which is the foundation for a community's long-term strategy to reduce disaster losses and break the cycle of disaster damage, reconstruction and repeated damage. Being ready helps recovery after a natural disaster.

As the number of Hazus users continues to increase, so do the types of uses. Increasingly, Hazus is being used by states and communities in support of risk assessments that perform economic loss scenarios for certain natural hazards and rapid needs assessments during hurricane response. Other communities are using Hazus to increase hazard awareness. Successful uses of Hazus are profiled under Mitigation and Recovery and Preparedness and Response. Emergency managers have also found these map templates helpful to support rapid impact assessment and disaster response.

== Requirements ==
Although Hazus-MH itself is free, it requires the users to have ArcGIS with ArcView license level.

In addition, ArcGIS Spatial Analyst extension is required for Flood Model. Furthermore, it currently is only available for use with ArcGIS version 10.4 (Current version is 10.6). As part of a major effort to modernize Hazus, a number of updates are in progress. In late 2014, an update was released to bring Hazus up to compatibility with ArcGIS 10.2.2 and Windows 8. Later in the Hazus Modernization process, new functional enhancements will be implemented in the flood module, and the underlying code of Hazus will be re-designed to align with current practices, enabling future development.

== Advanced analysis ==
Mapping results from the Advanced Engineering Building Module (AEBM) for earthquake hazards Salt Lake Community.

== User community ==
Hazus has a substantial user group community that includes a Hazus LinkedIn group and several Hazus User Groups across the nation "providing a network of HAZUS users, promoting and supporting the application of the FEMA HAZUS software for disaster mitigation, planning, response and recovery. This group is supported by HAZUS.org the independent on-line voice for the HAZUS user community and the ultimate resource for everything HAZUS". Its reach includes 40 User Groups managed by 38 User Group Leaders, "Hazus User Groups (HUGs) provide a network of public and private sector organizations and industry partnerships to collaborate and disseminate Hazus information and data throughout the nation. Hazus User Group members include emergency managers, Geospatial Information System (GIS) specialists, geologists, state and local planners, consultants and other stakeholders who use Hazus software for risk assessment activities." Each Hazus User Group conducts its own training, holds seminars, and occasionally holds group-wide User Group Conference calls.
