= Conservation Geoportal =

Online geoportal of geographic information systems

The Conservation Geoportal was an online geoportal, intended to provide a comprehensive listing of geographic information systems (GIS) datasets and web map service relevant to biodiversity conservation. It is currently defunct. The site, its contents and functionality were free for anyone to use and contribute to. The Conservation Geoportal was launched on June 28, 2006 at the joint Society for Conservation Biology and Society for Conservation GIS Conference in San Jose, California, USA. As of October 2007, it included metadata for over 3,667 GIS records.

== History ==
The Conservation Geoportal was conceived when representatives from a group of conservation-minded organizations met at the National Geographic Society in March 2005 to define a vision for a World Conservation Base Map. Initially the focus on developing an inventory or catalog of datasets and maps in the form of a metadata database was to be mined to develop the Conservation Base Map and Atlas.

== Overview ==
The Conservation Geoportal constitutes a collaborative effort by and for the conservation community to facilitate the discovery and publishing of GIS data and maps, to support conservation decision-making and education. It does not actually store maps and data, but rather the descriptions and links to those data resources. These descriptions are known as metadata. It was intended to provide an efficient point of access for people interested in a full range of conservation-related GIS data. Capabilities of the Conservation Geoportal included:

- Search for data and maps by keyword, category, geography, or time period
- Save search queries for future use
- Use the built-in Map Viewer to display, manipulate, and combine live map services
- Map viewer supports OpenGIS standards (WMS, WFS, WCS) and ArcIMS services
- Create, save, and email custom maps using data from various web map service
- Publish metadata for maps and data so others can find them
- Featured Map section
- Content in designated thematic data channels
- Share information with other geoportal

== Status ==
- Sponsored by The Nature Conservancy, National Geographic Society and UNEP-World Conservation Monitoring Centre
- ~2,000 visitors per month at its peak
- ~3,667 metadata records & 515 registered users

== Data channels ==
The Conservation Geoportal included Data Channels and Sub-channels to organize and facilitate access to metadata describing data and maps in a given topic or theme. Channels provided quick access (2 clicks to content) to key data resources that experts consider important to the larger user community. Channels were managed by organizations and experts (channel stewards) knowledgeable about that theme, including:

- Conservation areas: Conservation areas can include existing legally protected areas, as well as areas of ecological or cultural significance identified through assessment and planning efforts. They represent areas where conservation activities are currently taking place or where one or more organizations intend to take action
- Species: Species distributions including amphibian, birds, fish, mammals and many others
- Habitats: Habitats and ecosystems
- Threats: Threats to biodiversity
- Environmental factors: Physical environmental factors including soils, geology, land cover/land use and oceanography
- Socioeconomics: Factors including population, economy, policy, culture, indigenous rights, ecosystem services
- Base map layers: Layers including roads, political boundaries, and satellite imagery

== Geoportal consortium ==
The Conservation Geoportal was designed and maintained collaboratively by a consortium of institutions including (in alphabetical order):

- American Museum of Natural History
- Conservation International
- Environmental Systems Research Institute
- IUCN - The World Conservation Union
- NASA
- National Geographic Society
- NatureServe
- Smithsonian Institution
- The Nature Conservancy
- UNEP - World Conservation Monitoring Centre
- University of Maryland - Global Land Cover Facility
- USGS - National Biological Information Infrastructure
- Waterborne Environmental, Inc.
- Wildlife Conservation Society
- World Resources Institute
- World Wildlife Fund

== Technology ==
The Conservation Geoportal was based on ESRI's GIS Portal Toolkit (Version 3.0) and ArcWeb Services technologies. Currently the site is maintained and hosted by ESRI. Although the underlying technology was proprietary, the Conservation Geoportal supports several metadata standards and OpenGIS standards, as:

- FGDC and ISO 19115 metadata standards
- Harvesting from ArcIMS, Z39.50, OAI, and WAF based metadata repositories
- OpenGIS WFS, WMS, and WCS services through the map viewer
- ArcIMS Image and ArcGIS Image Server
- OpenLS geocoder

== Mashup capabilities ==
The Map Viewer let users overlay or mashup data layers from different map servers, which may be hosted by different organizations using different protocols (e.g., ArcIMS, WMS). For example, by searching the catalog, users could discover three different map services, hosted by the Nature Conservancy, Conservation International, and World Wildlife Fund, delineating conservation priority areas. Then, with a click, these live maps can be overlaid together in the Map Viewer along with a satellite image backdrop from NASA. Users could then zoom and pan to their area of interest, turn layers on and off, adjust transparencies, and save that map view to a URL, which they can e-mail to their colleagues to show how various priority maps compare. When their colleagues click the link, exactly the same map view opens, allowing them to work with the live map, perhaps adding map services or posting the link to the map view on their Web site.

== Parent project ==
The Conservation Geoportal was intended to support the principles and objectives of the Conservation Commons. At its simplest, it encourages organizations and individuals alike to ensure open access to data, information, expertise and knowledge related to the conservation of biodiversity. The Conservation Commons is the expression of a cooperative effort of non-governmental organizations, international and multi-lateral organizations, governments, academia, and the private sector, to improve open access to and unrestricted use of, data, information and knowledge related to the conservation of biodiversity with the belief that this will contribute to improving conservation outcomes.

== Sources ==
- Biasi, F. 2007. New Conservation GeoPortal Taps into a World of Maps and Data, ArcWatch (May)
- ArcNews Online Conservation GeoPortal to Support Worldwide Data Sharing and Discovery. (Summer 2006)
- ConserveOnline (2006) Short Concept Paper on Conservation Basemap, Atlas, & GeoPortal.^{[usurped]} (.doc format)
