= ArcExplorer =

Lightweight data viewer

ArcExplorer is a lightweight data viewer from ESRI for maps and GIS data in these formats:

- ESRI Shapefile
- ArcInfo coverages
- ArcSDE layers
- Images
- ArcIMS Services (e.g., Geography Network sources)

ArcExplorer performs a variety of basic GIS functions, including display, query, and data retrieval applications.

The ArcExplorer installation can be freely distributed on spatial data CDs so recipients can view data effectively.

Esri regards ArcGIS Explorer as superseding ArcExplorer.

== Versions ==
- ArcExplorer 9.2 Java Edition
- ArcExplorer Web
- ArcExplorer Java Edition for Education - Created to allow educators using Mac OS X to utilize GIS in the classroom.
- ArcExplorer 2
