= ArcView =

- Developer(s): Esri
- Stable release: 10
- Operating system: Windows
- Type: GIS
- License: Proprietary
- Website: esri.com/software/arcgis/arcview/

ArcView, now referred to as ArcGIS for Desktop Basic, is the entry-level licensing level of ArcGIS Desktop, a geographic information system software product produced by Esri. It is intended by Esri to be the logical migration path from ArcView 3.x.

== History ==
=== ArcView 8.x and 9.x ===
ArcView 8.x and 9.x are part of the ArcGIS Desktop software suite. ArcView is the entry level of licensing offered; it is able to view and edit GIS data held in a flat file database or through ArcSDE, ST-Links PgMap view data held in a relational database management system. Other licensing levels in the suite; namely ArcEditor and ArcInfo have greater functionality. All components are installed on the system, with only those that are licensed being made functional. The current version of ArcView sold by Esri is 10.

The ArcView software is split between ArcMap and ArcCatalog. ArcMap is used for map composition and geographic analysis. ArcCatalog is used for geographic data management.

== See also ==
- ArcInfo
- Shapefile
- ArcView 3.x
