= Esri Education User Conference =

Esri's Education User Conference

Launched in 2000, Esri's Education User Conference (EdUC), is organized and hosted by Esri's Educational Programs Team the weekend before the annual Esri International User Conference (Esri UC). Held in San Diego, California, during the month of July, the mission of the EdUC is to support and promote the use of geographic information systems (GIS) in educational research, instruction, administration, and policy. Over the years, it has grown into a sizable and popular event for those involved in using and teaching GIS in the greater educational community. This includes school teachers, youth program leaders, college and university instructors, community leaders, librarians, museum professionals, and administrators of educational institutions. The conference includes user presentation sessions, hands-on training workshops, exhibits, special interest group meetings, and a plenary session including a keynote presentation.

User presentations are organized into several tracks, including teaching with GIS, using GIS for administration and policy-making, community projects, using GIS in libraries and museums, and research on the impacts of GIS in educational settings. Presentation materials are compiled into proceedings which are published online, after the conference.

Hands-on training workshops address both the pedagogical aspects of using GIS in a classroom setting and specific software skills. The exhibits provide access to businesses, government agencies, and other organizations with products and services for using GIS in education, including GPS hardware, curriculum and textbooks, software, and certificate/degree programs. Special Interest Group (SIG) meetings provide an opportunity for networking and in-depth discussion of specialized topics.

Prior to the establishment of the EdUC, activities for educators were a regular part of the Esri UC. Today, these activities are designed to draw attendees from both the EdUC and the International UC, encouraging collaboration between academia, business, and government. For example, the Academic GIS Program Fair was launched at the Esri UC in the 1990s and has since become incorporated into the Esri EdUC. This event provides attendees with the opportunity to meet with representatives from colleges and universities about their academic GIS programs and educational offerings.

In 2009, the GeoMentor program was announced during opening ceremonies at the Esri UC. This program pairs GIS professionals that would like to share their expertise with teachers that want to engage their students with GIS technology. The GeoMentor program operates as a Web-based matchmaking service between the GIS expert and the classroom and provides a structure to help professionals who work in different spheres to successfully collaborate.

== History ==
An ever-evolving event, Esri's Education User Conference has introduced various programs over the years including 4H Club participation in 2006 and the GeoMentor program in 2009. Annual keynote speakers are chosen for their interest and involvement in current issues related to geography or geographic thinking.

Keynote Speakers

- 2000 – Keynote Speaker: Mary Marlino, Digital Library for Earth System Education, "Role of DLESE in geography education." First International Conference on GIS in Education. Held at Cal State San Bernardino. Despite 107 degree heat, over 250 attendees.
- 2001 – Keynote Speaker: Roger Downs, Pennsylvania State University. Name changed to Esri Education User Conference and moved to San Diego with Esri's International User Conference. Jack Dangermond spoke to group at the closing keynote.
- 2002 – Keynote Speaker: Michael Goodchild, National Center for Geographic Information and Analysis, University of California Santa Barbara, "The Evolution of GIS." Conference moved to San Diego Marriott Hotel.
- 2003 – Keynote Speaker: Bob Pawloski, University of Nebraska at Omaha, "The partnership between the university and the National Geographic Society commemorating the bicentennial of the Lewis and Clark expedition." First EdUC Travel Scholarships, sponsored by GDT.
- 2004 – Keynote Speaker: Sandra Henderson, science educator, University Corporation for Atmospheric Research, "Applying Hands-on, Inquiry-Based Learning to Geographic Education." First Geo-Treasure Hunt, a GPS-based scavenger hunt sponsored by Trimble.
- 2005 – Keynote Speaker: David Rumsey, Founder Rumsey Collection of Historical maps, "Historical and Contemporary Methods of Teaching Geography." Michael Fay, National Geographic Society Explorer, reports on a recent project that looked at the relationship between people and African ecosystems. Exhibits included a special display of several items from Rumsey's personal collection.
- 2006 – Keynote Speaker: Dr. Allen Carroll, Chief Cartographer, National Geographic Society, "Current State of Geographic Education." 4H Club members attend EdUC
- 2007 – Keynote Speaker: Curtis W. Sumner, executive director of the American Congress on Surveying and Mapping, "GIS the fourth 'R' in Education" ESRI's Education Community Web site launched. Attendees of Esri Survey Summit invited to participate in EdUC and vice versa.
- 2008 – Keynote Speaker: Dr. Anne Knowles, professor of geography, Middlebury College, "Using GIS in Historic Scholarship and Teaching History." Hands-On Learning Lab added to program to provide more training opportunities.
- 2009 – Keynote Speaker: Dr. Henk Scholten, professor of spatial informatics, Vrije Universiteit, "The Importance of Spatial Thinking Today." GeoMentor program launched
- 2010 – Keynote Speaker: Mark Chandler, International Director of Research, Earthwatch Institute, "Citizen Science and GIS."
