= GeoSTAC =

GIS set of spatial data and tools

GeoSTAC is a set of spatial data and tools accessed through a Geographic Information System.

The databases currently contain about 55 GB of data and there are three specialised spatial analysis tools currently available. GeoSTAC concentrates on agricultural and environmental GIS issues. It provides a consistent framework for analyses. One of the primary reasons for GeoSTAC is to understand the agricultural landscape and the interaction of important environmental variables.

GeoSTAC runs within the ESRI ArcGIS software platform (ESRI, Redlands, CA) with the ESRI Spatial Analyst extension.

With GeoSTAC, users can perform geospatial analysis that involves:

- Crop production
- Soils characteristics
- Natural resources management
- Weather
- Land use/land cover
- Agrochemical use
- River and stream networks
- Watershed characteristics

The databases within GeoSTAC cover all or part of the United States, although the methods can be applied to any area for which data is available. Many of the operations possible with GeoSTAC could be performed manually by proficient GIS users. However, GeoSTAC enables these to be performed more easily and with much of the data necessary already collated.
