= GeoTime =

Geospatial analysis software

- Developer: Uncharted Software Inc. (formerly Oculus Info Inc.)
- Release: May 18, 2005; 21 years ago
- Stable release: 6.2 / February 25, 2020; 6 years ago
- Operating system: Windows 8/8.1 or 10
- Platform: x86-64
- Type: Geographic information system
- License: Proprietary commercial software
- Website: geotime.com

GeoTime is geospatial analysis software that allows the visual analysis of events over time. It adds time as the third dimension to a two-dimensional map (which can include 3D projection of terrain elevation geodata or any abstract diagrammatic space), allowing users to see changes within time series data. Users can view real-time animated playback of data and use automated analysis tools within the software to identify location patterns, connections between events, and trends.

GeoTime can import data in many formats, such as GPX, Shapefile, KML, Microsoft Excel, CSV, geotagged photos, and from live data sources via GeoRSS and RSS web feeds and WMS servers. It supports most telecommunication carrier reporting formats (CDR), including tower/sector information. These features allow users to aggregate data from satellites, mobile phones, social networking web sites, web server logs and many other sources. GeoTime can export data to other GIS software such as Google Earth and ESRI ArcGIS via KML format, and to other applications via CSV, as well as capture video of data animations. An ArcGIS extension is available that allows GeoTime to work alongside the popular ArcGIS geographic information system with bi-directional data sharing between the two programs.

GeoTime was a winner of the IEEE Visual Analytics Science and Technology (VAST) conference contest for three years in a row.

== Customers ==
GeoTime has been used by professionals in public safety (including metropolitan police and emergency management), telecommunications, academic research, healthcare and human services, and the U.S. military. It has been used to analyze data from sources as diverse as downhill skiing, influenza monitoring, and GPS wildlife tracking. A list of customers is available on the GeoTime web site.

== Controversy ==
Lawyers and privacy campaigners have questioned whether innocent individuals may be tracked by the software, which has been likened to a computer program in the science fiction film Minority Report.

== See also ==
- ArcGIS
- Geographic information system § Adding the dimension of time
- Telecommunications data retention
- Time geography
