= Esri grid =

Raster GIS file format

An Esri grid is a raster GIS file format developed by Esri, which has two formats:

1. A proprietary binary format, also known as an ARC/INFO GRID, ARC GRID and many other variations
2. A non-proprietary ASCII format, also known as an ARC/INFO ASCII GRID

The formats were introduced for ARC/INFO. The binary format is widely used within Esri programs, such as ArcGIS, while the ASCII format is used as an exchange, or export format, due to the simple and portable ASCII file structure.

The grid defines geographic space as an array of equally sized square grid points arranged in rows and columns. Each grid point stores a numeric value that represents a geographic attribute (such as elevation or surface slope) for that unit of space. Each grid cell is referenced by its x,y coordinate location.

== File formats ==
=== ASCII ===
In Esri grid data, the first six lines indicate the reference of the grid, followed by the values listed in "English reading order" (left-right and top-down). For example, consider a grid, shown to the left. This could be encoded into an ASCII grid file, that would look like:

Grid image
Values

	25	75	125	175
275	NA	NA	5	2
225	NA	20	100	36
175	3	8	35	10
125	32	42	50	6
75	88	75	27	9
25	13	5	1	NA

ASCII grid format

ncols         4
nrows         6
xllcorner     0.0
yllcorner     0.0
cellsize      50.0
NODATA_value  -9999
-9999 -9999 5 2
-9999 20 100 36
3 8 35 10
32 42 50 6
88 75 27 9
13 5 1 -9999

where

- ncols and nrows are the numbers of columns and rows, respectively (represented as integers);
- xllcorner and yllcorner are the western (left) x-coordinate and southern (bottom) y-coordinates, such as easting and northing (represented as real numbers with an optional decimal point),
  - when the data points are cell-centered xllcenter and yllcenter are used to indicate such registration.
- cellsize is the length of one side of a square cell (a real number); and,
- nodata_value is the value that is regarded as "missing" or "not applicable"; this line is optional, but highly recommended as some programs expect this line to be declared (a real number).

The remainder of the file lists the raster values for each cell, starting at the upper-left corner. These real numbers (with optional decimal point, if needed) are delimited using a single space character.

=== Binary format ===
A binary Esri grid is stored in several files contained in at least two directories: the name directory and an info directory, where name has strict naming conventions. The grid name must begin with an alphabetic character and must only include alphanumeric characters or the underscore ("_") character. A multiple-band grid (a collection of grids also known as a "stack" in ArcGIS) cannot have more than 9 characters in its file name, and a single-band raster dataset cannot have more than 13 characters.
