= ArcSDE =

Geographic information system

- Original author(s): Geographic Technologies Incorporated (GTI)
- Developer(s): Esri
- Initial release: 1995
- Stable release: 10
- Operating system: MS Windows; AIX, HP-UX, Linux, Solaris
- Type: Geographic information system
- License: Proprietary
- Website: https://web.archive.org/web/20060316161213/http://www.esri.com/software/arcgis/arcsde/

ArcSDE (Arc Spatial Database Engine) is a server-software sub-system (produced and marketed by Esri) that aims to enable the usage of relational database management systems for spatial data. The spatial data may then be used as part of a geodatabase.

== History ==
Geographic Technologies Incorporated (GTI) in Australia originally designed the database software, named Spatial DataBase Engine (SDBE). Development shifted to Salamanca Software Pvt Ltd., which developed the first production version. SDBE originally used the InterBase DBMS. The president of Esri, Jack Dangermond, announced SDE at the GIS'95 conference in Vancouver, British Columbia, and Esri purchased Salamanca Software in 1996. Esri rebranded the software as "ArcSDE" to follow the naming convention of other products.

ArcSDE grew to meet the need of users of geographic data for robust multi-user editing, storage and access of extremely large geospatial databases. ArcSDE supports the Esri geodatabase implementation.

The product began as stand-alone software: Esri integrated it into ArcGIS version 9.2.

In 2013 ESRI announced plans to deprecate the ArcSDE command line tools and the ArcSDE application server following the forthcoming release of ArcGIS 10.2.

=== ArcSDE 10.1 and 10.2 ===
As of June 2012 with the release of 10.1, Esri sells ArcSDE as a component of ArcGIS Server - part of the ArcGIS family of software products which integrates geographic-information query, mapping, spatial analysis, and editing within a multi-user enterprise DBMS environment.

== Functionality ==
ArcSDE enables organizations to move from a traditional approach — managing separate collections of geographic data files — to an integrated environment in which one can manage spatial data as a continuous database: accessible to the entire organization simultaneously and easily publishable on the Web. It stores spatial data using the Geodatabase data model and structure.

ArcSDE as an application server facilitates storing and managing spatial data (raster, vector, and survey) in a DBMS and makes the data available to many applications. ArcSDE allows one to manage spatial data in any of four commercial databases (IBM Db2, Informix, Microsoft SQL Server and Oracle). Starting with the 9.3 release, Esri added support for the open-source PostgreSQL database.

ArcSDE serves data for the advanced ArcGIS Desktop products (ArcView, ArcEditor and ArcInfo); the ArcGIS development products (ArcGIS Engine and ArcGIS Server), ArcView 3.x as well as ArcIMS. It is a key component in managing a multi-user Esri-based GIS.

While traditional RDBMS software keeps track of the tables and records contained in the database, ArcSDE pushes the relational model higher so that client software can manage geographic data - which comprise several tables - seamlessly. The user need have no awareness of nor dealings with the particulars of the RDBMS. The GIS environment routes all connections to the database through the ArcSDE middleware, which manages the storing and retrieval of data.
