= Activity space =

Term in social science

In social science, the activity space designates the "set of places individuals encounter as a result of their routine activities in everyday life."

The activity space can include all relevant locations that an individual routinely go to, such as the place of residence, the workplace (or the place of study), but also gyms, supermarkets, or cinemas.

== Definition ==
Activity space research started in the field of geography and urban planning, where scholars investigated the effect of urban spatial structure on individual behavior. Horton and Reynolds define the activity space "as the subset of all urban locations with which the individual has direct contact as the result of day-to-day activities." They consider the activity space as a subset of one's "action space," which they define as "the collection of all urban locations about which the individual has information and the subjective utility or preference he associates with these locations". The "action space" is often use synonymously with the terms "awareness space," "mental map," and "cognitive map."

The emergence of the cognitive science has broadened the scope of activity space beyond the realm of physicality. Scientists like David Kirsh define activity space as the blend of several components. These components include:

- The goal a task is meant to accomplish or problem it is meant to resolve
- The physical space the task is performed within
- The actions an "agent" is capable of taking
- The concepts, plans, and other abstract resources agents find in the environment or bring to the task in their minds

== See also ==
- Absolute space and time
- Method of loci
- Social space
- Sociology of space
- Spatial analysis
- Spatial memory
- Time geography
