= Baid =

Baid or BAID may refer to:

- Barrow Area Information Database, a database supporting arctic science
- Beaux-Arts Institute of Design, a former art and architecture school in New York City
- The BioAssay identification number, an identifying number for chemical compounds used by the PubChem database
- Chandan Mal Baid, a leader of the Indian National Congress
