= ArcView 3.x =

Geographic information system software

ArcView GIS 3.x
- ArcView GIS showing data for the Chesapeake Bay.
- Developer(s): ESRI
- Initial release: October 5, 1995
- Final release: 3.3 / May 22, 2002
- Operating system: ArcView 3.3: Windows, Solaris, AIX, IRIX, Digital UNIX, HP-UX; ArcView 3.0a: in addition Classic Mac OS, DG/UX
- Type: GIS
- License: Proprietary

ArcView GIS was a geographic information system software product produced by ESRI. It was replaced by new product line, ArcGIS, in 2000. ArcView had a committed user base and continued to be used for several years after being replaced.

== History ==
ArcView started as a graphical program for spatial data and maps made using ESRI's other software products. In subsequent versions, more functionality was added to ArcView and it became a true GIS program capable of complex analysis and data management. The simple GUI was preferred by many over the less user friendly, more powerful ARC/INFO that was primarily used from a Command-line interface.

=== ArcView 1.0 ===
ArcView 1.0 was released in 1991 to provide access to GIS for non-traditional users of the technology. ESRI's flagship professional GIS at the time, Arc/INFO, was based on a command line interface and was not accessible to users that only needed view and query capability. The release did not support Shapefiles at the time.

=== ArcView 2.x ===
ArcView 1 was very popular, and ESRI promised a more functional 2.x version of the product. This product was developed using a multi-platform windowing environment called Neuron Data, which allowed the product to be supported on the increasingly popular Windows 95 and Windows 2000, UNIX, and Mac OS 9 platforms. This product, when finally released (18 months after its initial release date) was very successful for ESRI and brought GIS technology to many people who had not used it before. Unfortunately, users found this version to be extremely unstable, frequently crashing with loss of all work in progress.

=== ArcView GIS 3.x ===
ArcView 3.x included even more full-featured GIS functionality, including a geoprocessing wizard and full support of extensions for raster and 3d processing. It was eventually renamed "ArcView GIS" by ESRI.

In 1997, ESRI released its final version supporting Mac OS 9 (3.0a). It is still available, although it only runs on older (PowerPC-based) Mac systems, under Mac OS 9.

The last release of ArcView GIS was version 3.3 (May 22, 2002), and was offered for both Unix and Windows variants.

=== Windows 7 & 8 installation instructions ===
It can be copied from an existing installation on a Windows XP machine to Vista, Windows 7 and 8 (search Esri Forums for Instructions).

You can also install it normally using the InstallShield 3 Setup Engine (Is3Engine.zip). The Setup Launcher for ArcView is a 16-bit application and not supported by 64 bit systems. However the InstallShield Engine is 32-bit and will run on a 64 bit system. Using the Is3Engine(File Name: setup32.exe) with its compatibility set to Windows XP SP3, Placed in a WRITABLE folder with the rest of your application install files and run instead of the original setup file (File Name: setup.exe) will allow the software to be installed on a Windows 7 or 8 64 bit system in the normal way. To have the ArcView Help files work you will need download and install WinHlp32.exe from Microsoft.

== See also ==
- ArcInfo
- Shapefile
- ArcView
