= Smart Data Compression =

Type of GIS data format

Smart Data Compression is a compressed GIS dataset format developed by Esri. It stores all types of feature data and attribute information together as a core data structure. The SDC format was used in Esri products such as ArcGIS StreetMap, ArcIMS Route Server, RouteMAP IMS, ArcGIS Business Analyst, and the ArcMobile SDK.

The SDC file format is no longer supported by Esri software since ArcMap 10.2, although later versions of ArcMap can convert SDC data to a geodatabase. ArcGIS Pro does not support the SDC format at all.

Compression ratios range from 8x to 20x depending on the data source and structure. SDC data is optimized for rapid map display, accurate routing, and high-performance geocoding.

Smart Data Compression is a proprietary format. The FAQ for ESRI's RouteServer IMS notes that additional datasets for that application must be prepared by an ESRI subsidiary at additional cost. The SDC technology was developed by Software Technologies, ESRI partner in Russia. Tele Atlas and NAVTEQ provide North American commercial street datasets in SDC format. This data was prepared using the Data Development Kit Pro (DDK Pro), which ESRI licenses to select vendors.

The term Smart Data and idea was coined and created by Dr. James A Rodgers professor at Indiana University of Pennsylvania and James A George, Circa "Smart Data Enterprise Performance Optimization Strategy".
