= ArcIMS =

- Screenshot of an ArcIMS web service
- Developer(s): Esri
- Stable release: 10
- Operating system: MS Windows; AIX, HP-UX, Linux, Solaris
- Type: Geographic information system
- License: Proprietary
- Website: http://www.esri.com/software/arcgis/arcims/

ArcIMS (standing for Arc Internet Map Server) is a Web Map Server produced by Esri accessible through a web browser. It is a GIS that is designed to serve maps across the Internet. Sometimes these maps are just static images allowing simple panning and zooming, while others are more complex pages. Examples of interactive maps served with ArcIMS include maps with layers that can be turned on and off, or with features containing attributes that can be queried.

== Implementation ==
The core of ArcIMS consists of a spatial server which processes most of the map-related services. On the server side, ArcIMS connector sits on top of a web server and ArcIMS component and Application server works behind the scenes. On the client side, the viewers can be thin clients, custom clients or Esri desktop applications such as ArcMap, ArcExplorer, or ArcPad.

ArcIMS uses Esri's ArcXML to receive and respond to requests from the client. The data behind ArcIMS is usually stored in Shapefile format (an open specification) or in an ArcSDE RDBMS database.

The Data Delivery Extension (DDE), an extension to the ArcIMS product, delivers data to users in a data format and coordinate system of their own choosing, in order to have access to data in a format compatible with their local GIS applications.

Esri no longer supports ArcIMS, having replaced its functionality with ArcGIS for Server in 2010 and with ArcGIS Online (AGOL).

== Version history ==
- 2000 June – ArcIMS 3.0 released
- 2001 May – ArcIMS 3.1 released
- 2002 April – ArcIMS 4.0 released
- 2003 February – ArcIMS 4.0.1 released
- 2004 May – ArcIMS 9.0 released
- 2005 May – ArcIMS 9.1 released
- 2006 November – ArcIMS 9.2 released
- 2008 June – ArcIMS 9.3 released
- 2009 April – ArcIMS 9.3.1 released
- 2010 June – ArcIMS 10.0 released
