= Conservation Commons =

The Conservation Commons is the expression of a cooperative effort of non-governmental organizations, international and multi-lateral organizations, governments, academia, and the private sector, to improve open access to and unrestricted use of, data, information and knowledge related to the conservation of biodiversity, with the belief that this will contribute to improving conservation outcomes. At its simplest, it encourages organizations and individuals alike to ensure open access to data, information, expertise and knowledge related to the conservation of biodiversity. The goal of the Conservation Commons is to promote conscious, effective, and equitable sharing of knowledge resources to advance conservation.

== Principles ==
- Open access - The Conservation Commons promotes free and open access to data, information and knowledge for all conservation purposes.
- Mutual benefit - The Conservation Commons welcomes and encourages participants to both use resources and to contribute data, information and knowledge.
- Rights and responsibilities - Contributors to the Conservation Commons have full right to attribution for any uses of their data, information, or knowledge, and the right to ensure that the original integrity of their contribution to the Commons is preserved. Users of the Conservation Commons are expected to comply, in good faith, with terms of uses specified by contributors.

== See also ==
- Conservation Geoportal
- International Union for Conservation of Nature
