= Society for Conservation GIS =

- Formation: 1997
- Type: Non-profit
- Members: 1000
- President: Jocelyn Tutak
- Website: www.scgis.org

The Society for Conservation Geographic Information Systems (SCGIS) is an international non-profit society with around 1000 members in 80 countries.

The idea for an international GIS user group for Conservation was first suggested by Charles Convis in 1991. Supported by grants from the Esri Conservation Program and hosted by the University of California James Reserve, this group met annually under evolving names, including the "Conservation GIS Alliance". It incorporated as the Society for Conservation GIS in 1997 and received initial endowments from Robert Arenz (Money-Arenz Foundation) and Jack Dangermond (Esri). Over the next 5 years, SCGIS grew to around 300 US members drawn from many of America's premier conservation organizations, united around a common concept of how technology can best be used to help non-profit conservationists worldwide. SCGIS adopts a broad view of conservation, the members and programs include native and First Nations peoples, environmental justice programs and sustainable development. The Gordon and Betty Moore Foundation awarded a "Science Special Projects" grant via The Nature Conservancy in 2004 which funded 6 new international SCGIS chapters and new national workshops and training programs in conservation technology. By 2007, SCGIS Kenya had grown to 100 members, SCGIS Madagascar had over 300 members and new chapters had started in Philippines, Slovenia, Brazil, South Africa, Siberia, DR Congo, Mexico & Russia. The book Conservation Geography (ISBN 1-58948-024-4) describes many SCGIS international member and chapter projects.

The SCGIS Mission is to assist conservationists worldwide in using GIS and spatial technologies through nonprofit conferences, programs, scholarships, and training. This helps to provide a level playing field so that conservation and local self-determination voices can be heard in development and resources decisions often conducted behind walls of expensive technologies and inaccessible data. Providing high-tech support, training and tools in an "appropriate technology" manner so that these tools are usable and beneficial for local activists, local programs and local communities is a core value of SCGIS. In 2018, SCGIS was given the John Muir Association Nonprofit Conservation Award for "leadership in the advancement of environmental protection or conservation".

Cover of 1999 issue of SCGIS newsletter

The multidisciplinary nature of cultural and natural resource conservation efforts benefits greatly from computer-based tools that manage information. In addition to data management, computer-based tools greatly enhance the communication of conservation ideas to policymakers and the public. One of the most effective computer-based tools is a Geographic Information System (GIS). GIS consists of software, hardware, geographic data, and scientific methods that can efficiently store and analyse various types of spatial data and display these data as maps, charts, videos, images, or other graphic types.

Supported by an all volunteer staff, a volunteer Board of Directors and Advisory Council, SCGIS hosts an annual conference that features discussion panels on the integration of GIS and conservation science, user group meetings, hands-on training sessions, and workshops. This Annual Conference, led by an all-volunteer Conference Committee, is recognized as a one-of-a-kind event that attracts GIS conservationists from all over the world. Technical seminar programs that are offered before and after the conference are especially popular; members who participate in the training and conference often report that their involvement has changed their lives. Published & filmed proceedings and Interviews have been created for member access since 2016 by the Scgis Camera Team. The Scgis Communications & Website committees support the official website with member-exclusive content including hundreds of technical workshops, conference proceedings & webinars. The SCGIS Global Committee oversees dozens of international chapters (as of 2019), an annual competitive Scholarship Program, and a growing global network of certified Conservation GIS Trainers.
