= Time geography =

Perspective on spatial and temporal proesses

Time geography or time-space geography is an evolving transdisciplinary perspective on spatial and temporal processes and events such as social interaction, ecological interaction, social and environmental change, and biographies of individuals. Time geography "is not a subject area per se", but rather an integrative ontological framework and visual language in which space and time are fundamental dimensions of analysis of dynamic processes. Time geography was originally developed by human geographers, but today it is applied in multiple fields related to transportation, regional planning, geography, anthropology, time-use research, ecology, environmental science, and public health. According to Swedish geographer Bo Lenntorp: "It is a basic approach, and every researcher can connect it to theoretical considerations in her or his own way."

== Origins ==
The Swedish geographer Torsten Hägerstrand created time geography in the mid-1960s based on ideas he had developed during his earlier empirical research on human migration patterns in Sweden. He sought "some way of finding out the workings of large socio-environmental mechanisms" using "a physical approach involving the study of how events occur in a time-space framework". Hägerstrand was inspired in part by conceptual advances in spacetime physics and by the philosophy of physicalism.

Hägerstrand's earliest formulation of time geography informally described its key ontological features: "In time-space the individual describes a path" within a situational context; "life paths become captured within a net of constraints, some of which are imposed by physiological and physical necessities and some imposed by private and common decisions". "It would be impossible to offer a comprehensive taxonomy of constraints seen as time-space phenomena", Hägerstrand said, but he "tentatively described" three important classes of constraints:

- capability constraints — limitations on the activity of individuals because of their biological structure and/or the tools they can command,
- coupling constraints — limitations that "define where, when, and for how long, the individual has to join other individuals, tools, and materials in order to produce, consume, and transact" (closely related to critical path analysis), and
- authority constraints — limitations on the domain or "time-space entity within which things and events are under the control of a given individual or a given group".

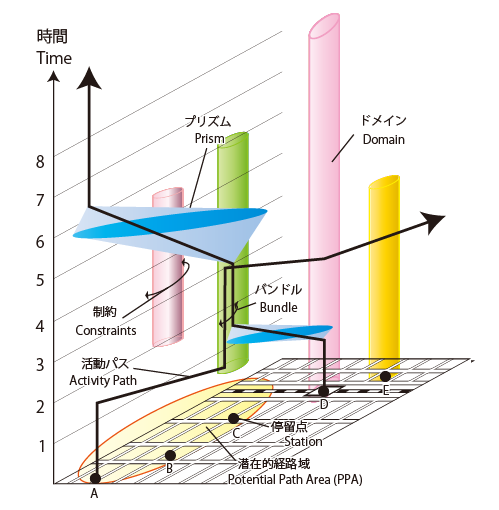
Examples of the visual language of time geography: space-time cube, path, prism, bundle, and other concepts

Hägerstrand illustrated these concepts with novel forms of graphical notation (inspired in part by musical notation), such as:

- the space-time aquarium (or space-time cube), which displays individual paths in axonometric graphical projection of space and time coordinates;
- the space-time prism, which shows individuals' possible behavior in time-space given their capability constraints and coupling constraints;
- bundles of paths, which are the conjunction of individual paths due in part to their capability constraints and coupling constraints, and which help to create "pockets of local order";
- concentric tubes or rings of accessibility, which indicate certain capability constraints of a given individual, such as limited spatial size and limited manual, oral-auditive and visual range; and
- nested hierarchies of domains, which show the authority constraints for a given individual or a given group.

While this innovative visual language is an essential feature of time geography, Hägerstrand's colleague Bo Lenntorp emphasized that it is the product of an underlying ontology, and "not the other way around. The notation system is a very useful tool, but it is a rather poor reflection of a rich world-view. In many cases, the notational apparatus has been the hallmark of time geography. However, the underlying ontology is the most important feature." Time geography is not only about time-geographic diagrams, just as music is not only about musical notation. Hägerstrand later explained: "What is briefly alluded to here is a 4-dimensional world of forms. This cannot be completely graphically depicted. On the other hand one ought to be able to imagine it with sufficient clarity for it to be of guidance in empirical and theoretical research."

By 1981, geographers Nigel Thrift and Allan Pred were already defending time geography against those who would see it "merely as a rigid descriptive model of spatial and temporal organization which lends itself to accessibility constraint analysis (and related exercises in social engineering)." They argued that time geography is not just a model of constraints; it is a flexible and evolving way of thinking about reality that can complement a wide variety of theories and research methods. In the decades since then, Hägerstrand and others have made efforts to expand his original set of concepts. By the end of his life, Hägerstrand had ceased using the phrase "time geography" to refer to this way of thinking and instead used words like topoecology.

== Later developments ==
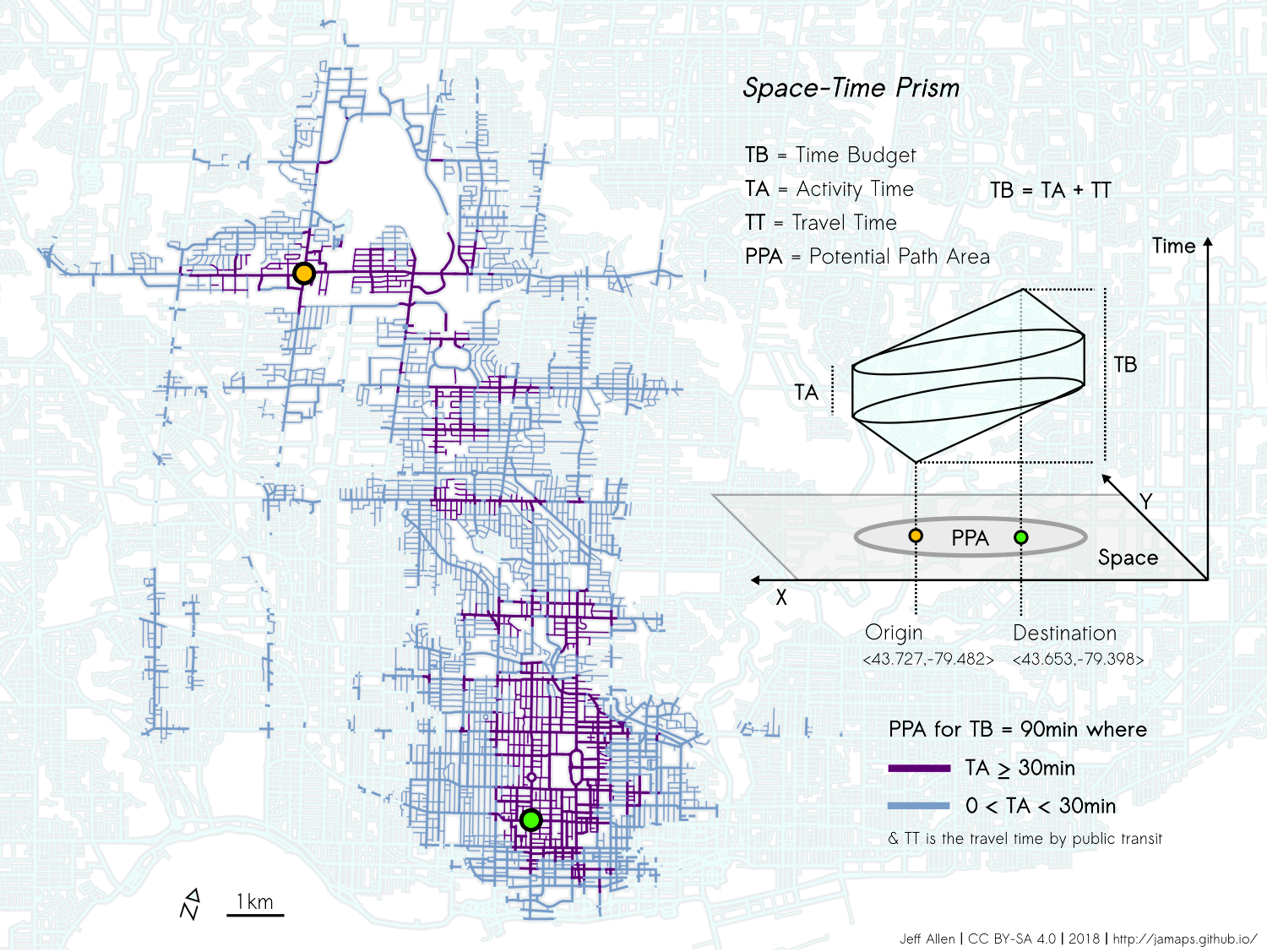
Schematic and example of a space-time prism using transit network data: On the right is a schematic diagram of a space-time prism, and on the left is a map of the potential path area for two different time budgets.

Since the 1980s, time geography has been used by researchers in the social sciences, the biological sciences, and in interdisciplinary fields.

In 1993, British geographer Gillian Rose noted that "time-geography shares the feminist interest in the quotidian paths traced by people, and again like feminism, links such paths, by thinking about constraints, to the larger structures of society." However, she noted that time geography had not been applied to issues important to feminists, and she called it a form of "social science masculinity". Over the following decades, feminist geographers have revisited time geography and have begun to use it as a tool to address feminist issues.

GIS software has been developed to compute and analyze time-geographic problems at a variety of spatial scales. Such analyses have used different types of network datasets (such as walking networks, highway networks, and public transit schedules) as well as a variety of visualization strategies. Specialized software such as GeoTime has been developed to facilitate time-geographic visualization and visual analytics.

Time geography has also been used as a form of therapeutic assessment in mental health.

Benjamin Bach and colleagues have generalized the space-time cube into a framework for temporal data visualization that applies to all data that can be represented in two dimensions plus time.

In the COVID-19 pandemic, time geography approaches were applied to identify close contacts. The pandemic imposed restrictions on the physical mobility of humans, which invited new applications of time geography in the increasingly virtualized post-Covid era.

== See also ==
- Activity space
- Agent based modeling
- Geographic information system § Adding the dimension of time
- GIS and public health
- Historical ecology
- Historical geographic information system
- Material flow analysis
- MuSIASEM
- Sankey diagram
- Spatiotemporal database
- Time–distance diagram
- Tobler's first law of geography
- Tobler's second law of geography
- Value of time
