= ArcGIS Pro =

Main component of geospatial processing programs suite

- ArcGIS Pro 2.8 on Windows 10
- Developer: Esri
- Stable release: 3.6 / November 13, 2025
- Operating system: Windows
- Type: GIS software
- License: Proprietary
- Website: www.esri.com/en-us/arcgis/products/arcgis-pro/overview

ArcGIS Pro is desktop GIS software developed by Esri, which replaces their ArcMap software generation. The product was announced as part of Esri's ArcGIS 10.3 release, ArcGIS Pro is notable in having a 64 bit architecture, combined 2-D, 3-D support, ArcGIS Online integration and Python 3 support.

A major version update occurred with the release of ArcGIS Pro 3.0 in June 2022. Several major changes include: the dropping of support for geocoders created with ArcMap 10.x and versions of ArcGIS Pro 2.9.x and earlier; project files created or modified with ArcGIS Pro 3.0 are not readable by versions 2.9.x and earlier; geodatabases created in 3.0 may not be fully compatible with prior versions; and perhaps most significantly , Parcel Fabric datasets created in prior versions must be upgraded to be fully compatible in version 3.0.

ArcGIS Pro released 3.6, which is supposed to, "enhance production, performance, and quality." Releases of ArcGIS Pro are typically supported through an 18-month "General Availability" phase before transitioning to a "Mature" support phase and then retirement.

== Versions ==
Version	Released
1.0	1/27/2015
1.1	7/16/2015
1.2	3/1/2016
1.3	7/7/2016
1.4	1/11/2017
2.0	6/27/2017
2.1	1/17/2018
2.2	6/26/2018
2.3	1/24/2019
2.4	6/27/2019
2.5	2/6/2020
2.6	7/28/2020
2.7	12/16/2020
2.8	5/13/2021
2.9	11/11/2021
3.0	6/23/2022
3.1	02/23/2023
3.2	11/7/2023
3.3	5/7/2024
3.4	11/7/2024
3.5	5/13/2025
3.6	11/13/2025
3.7	15/5/2026

== See also ==
- Geographic information systems software
- Comparison of geographic information systems software
