= David Kirsh =

Canadian cognitive scientist

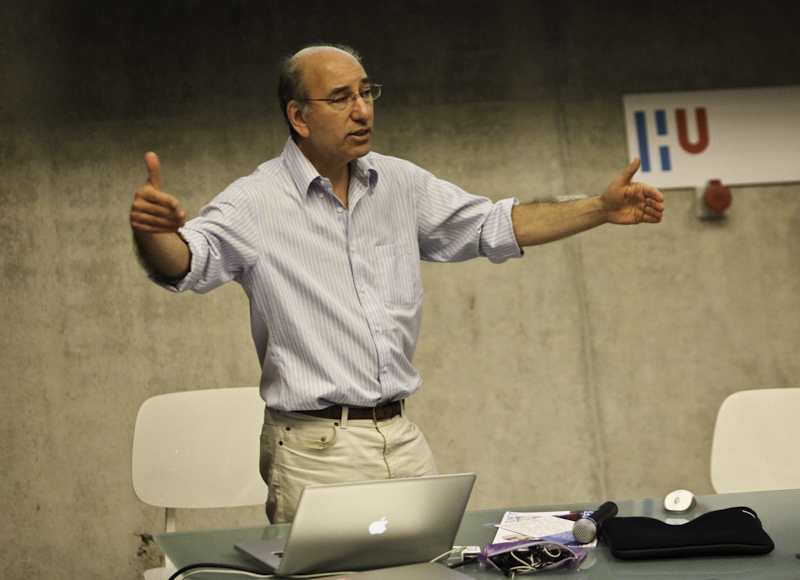
- Born: 1950 (age 75–76)
- Education: University of Toronto (BA); University of Oxford (DPhil)
- Scientific career
- Fields: Cognitive science, Information architecture, Attention management. Human-computer interaction
- Thesis: Representation and rationality: foundations of cognitive science.
- Academic advisors: Gareth Evans; A. J. Ayer
- Website: https://adrenaline.ucsd.edu/kirsh/

David Kirsh (born 1950) is a Canadian cognitive scientist. He is a professor of cognitive science at the University of California, San Diego (UCSD), where he heads the Interactive Cognition Lab and the Extended Reality Lab. From 2021 to 2023, he was the President of the Academy of Neuroscience for Architecture (ANFA), where he remains on the board of directors.

== Biography ==
He received his BA from the University of Toronto in 1972, he travelled for a few years in central Asia and India, received an MA in 1976 from University of Toronto and his D.Phil. from the University of Oxford in 1983 with the thesis Representation and rationality: foundations of cognitive science. At Oxford he studied under A. J. Ayer and Gareth Evans.

Prior to arriving at UCSD, he spent five years as a research scientist at the MIT Artificial Intelligence Laboratory from 1984 to 1989. Since 1989, he has been on faculty at the Department of Cognitive Science at University of California, San Diego (UCSD), where he also served as chair for a few years. Since 1989, he has been director of the Interactive Cognition Lab and from 2022 director of the Extended Reality Lab.

His research interests include cognitive and neuroscience of architecture, interactive design, thinking in and with the body and senses, embodied cognition, distributed cognition, extended mind, modern AI, and human-computer interaction.

== Publications ==
Kirsh published several books and articles. A selection:

- 1983. Representation and rationality : foundations of cognitive science. Thesis D.Phil. University of Oxford
- 1992. Foundations of artificial intelligence. Edited by David Kirsh Cambridge, Mass; London : MIT Press.
- 2003. Proceedings of the Twenty-Fifth Annual Conference of the Cognitive Science Society : July 30-August 2, 2003, Park Plaza Hotel, Boston, Massachusetts, USA. edited by Richard Alterman and David Kirsh. Cognitive Science Society (U.S.). Conference (25th : 2003 : Boston, Mass.)

Articles, a selection

- 1990. When is Information Explicitly Represented?. In: The Vancouver Studies in Cognitive Science. (1990) pp. 340–365.
- 1991. Today the Earwig Tomorrow Man?. In: Artificial Intelligence. (1991).
- 1995. On Distinguishing Epistemic from Pragmatic Actions. (written with P. Maglio). Cognitive Science. (1995).
- 1995. The Intelligent Use of Space. Artificial Intelligence, Vol. 73, Number 1-2, pp. 31–68, (1995).
- 1995. Complementary strategies: Why we use our hands when we think. In Johanna D. Moore and Jill Fain Lehman (Eds.) Proceedings of the Seventeenth Annual Conference of the Cognitive Science Society. pp. 212–217. 1995.
- 1996. Adapting the Environment instead of Oneself. Adaptive Behavior 4(3–4):415-452, 1996
- 1999. Distributed Cognition, Coordination and Environment Design. In: Proceedings of the European conference on Cognitive Science. 1999 pp 1–11.
- 2000. A Few Thoughts on Cognitive Overload, Intellectica, 2000 pp 19–51
- 2003. Implicit and Explicit Representation, Encyclopedia of Cognitive Science, 2003]
- 2001. The Context of Work. In: Human computer Interaction, 2001 Vol 16(2–4), pp. 305–322
- Metacognition, Distributed Cognition and Visual Design
- Multi-tasking and Cost Structure: Implications for Design. In, Bruno G. Bara, L. Barsalou, & M. Bucciarelli Mahwah (Eds.), Proceedings of the 27th Annual Meeting of the Cognitive Science Society. (pp. 1143–1148) Austin, TX: Cognitive Science Society.
- 2006. Distributed Cognition, A Methodological Note. Pragmatics & Cognition, 14:2 (2006), 249–262.
- 2009. Interaction, External Representations and Sense Making. In N. A. Taatgen & H. van Rijn (Eds.), Proceedings of the 31st Annual Conference of the Cognitive Science Society (pp. 1103–1108). Austin, TX: Cognitive Science Society
- 2009. Projection, Problem Space and Anchoring. In N. A. Taatgen & H. van Rijn (Eds.), Proceedings of the 31st Annual Conference of the Cognitive Science Society (pp. 2310–2315). Austin, TX: Cognitive Science Society.
- 2009. Knowledge, Explicit vs Implicit. In, The Oxford Companion to Consciousness. Bayne, T., Cleeremans, A., Wilken, P. (Eds.) (pp. 397–402). Cambridge: Cambridge University Press
- 2009. Problem Solving and Situated Cognition. In, Philip Robbins & M. Aydede (Eds.) (pp. 264–306) The Cambridge Handbook of Situated Cognition. Cambridge: Cambridge University Press, 2009.
- 2009. Explaining Artifact Evolution. To appear in, Cognitive Life of Things: Recasting the Boundaries of the Mind. Malafouris, L. (Ed.). McDonald Institute for Archaeological Research, Cambridge, April 7–9, 2009. Cambridge: Cambridge University press.

== Courses ==
Recently Professor Kirsh has taught such courses as:

- Foundations of Artificial Intelligence
- Cognitive Science 100: Cyborgs now and in the future
- Cognitive Science 87: Designing Digital Environments
- Cognitive Science 187A: Usability and Information Architecture
- Cognitive Science 187B: Practicum in Professional Web Design
- Cognitive Science 160: Creative Cognition, A Practicum in Ethnography
- Cognitive Science 160: Cognitive and Neuroscience for Architecture
- Cognitive Science 199: Undergraduate Research on various topics about Neuroscience for architecture, Creative Cognition, HCI, Embodied Cognition and Thinking in the senses.
