= ArcEditor =

- Developer: Esri
- Stable release: 10
- Operating system: Windows, Solaris, AIX, Tru64 UNIX
- Type: GIS
- License: Proprietary
- Website: esri.com/software/arcgis/arceditor/

ArcEditor is the midlevel software suite designed for advanced editing of spatial data published in the proprietary Esri format. It is part of the ArcGIS product. It provides tools for the creation of map and spatial data used in Geospatial Information Systems. ArcEditor is not intended for advanced spatial analysis, which can be performed using the highest level of ArcGIS, ArcInfo.
