= ArcObjects =

ArcObjects is a development environment of the ArcGIS family of applications. Using Visual Basic for Applications, C# or Java SDK for ArcGIS, it allows developers to extend these applications.
ArcObjects is a library of Component Object Model (COM) components that build up the foundation of Esri's ArcGIS platform. ArcObjects is written primarily in the C++ programming language. Since ArcGIS is completely built on top of ArcObjects, the ArcGIS platform can be fully customized and extended by making use of its COM services and capabilities. This allows for easy extension of the ArcObjects data model with any programming language that is compatible with COM, such as Visual Basic, C#, Visual Basic.NET, Java and Python. COM enables components to be reused at a binary level, meaning developers do not require access to the source code of ArcObjects in order to extend the ArcGIS platform. For this reason, an ArcObjects programmer can make use of any type inside the ArcObjects system without knowing the implementation details of the type, only needing to know what the type is able to do.

The ArcObjects data model is based on the COM standard, which makes it compatible with other COM objects and applications. This allows for easy integration and collaboration with other systems that are also based on the COM standard. The ArcGIS platform was built using ArcObjects types, such as classes, interfaces, and enumerations. ArcObjects use COM interfaces to organize and communicate properties and methods of its classes, ensuring compatibility with other COM-based objects and systems. When working with an ArcObjects COM class, its properties and methods are accessed solely through one of its implemented interfaces via the process of Query Interface (QI). Multiple interfaces are commonly available for classes in ArcObjects. For example, it is possible to query for additional interfaces implemented by an object after instantiation via the process of QI. Although only one interface can be used when instantiating an object, multiple interfaces are often available for classes in ArcObjects, allowing for greater flexibility and compatibility with other systems based on the COM standard.
