= ArcGIS Server =

Core server geographic information system software

- Developer(s): Esri
- Initial release: May 1, 2004; 21 years ago
- Stable release: 11.5 / May 22, 2025; 13 days ago
- Operating system: Linux, Windows
- Platform: Cross-platform
- Type: GIS software (compare)
- License: Proprietary
- Website: enterprise.arcgis.com/en/server/

ArcGIS Server is the core server geographic information system (GIS) software made by Esri. ArcGIS Server is used for creating and managing GIS Web services, applications, and data. ArcGIS Server is typically deployed on-premises within the organization’s service-oriented architecture (SOA) or off-premises in a cloud computing environment.

== Background ==
ArcGIS Server services supply mapping and GIS capabilities via ArcGIS Online for Esri Web and client applications, such as ArcGIS Desktop, ArcLogistics, the ArcGIS.com Viewer, ArcGIS Explorer, ArcGIS Explorer Online, ArcGIS Viewer for Flex, ArcGIS Mapping for SharePoint, Esri Business Analyst Online (BAO), and applications built with ArcGIS for iOS or BAO for iOS. Numerous third-party applications are licensed to use ArcGIS Server services, as well.

ArcGIS Server extensions allow GIS functionality available within a subset of ArcGIS Desktop extensions to be deployed as Web Services. ArcGIS Server extensions include 3D, Spatial, Geostatistical, Network, Geoportal, Image, Data Interoperability, Workflow Manager, and Schematics.

Typical customer applications include using ArcGIS Server mapping and spatial analysis services in geoportals and spatial data infrastructure, integration with the organization’s asset, customer relationship, natural resource, or work order management system, development of situational awareness or common operating picture solutions, online store and resource locators, public-facing Web portals for government transparency, online tracking of weather events, resource movement, or visualizing change over time, sharing of scientific research and modeling, management and delivery of remote sensing data, collaborative mapping and user-generated content applications, as well as managing data collection projects using mobile devices and global positioning system (GPS) and supporting mobile data intelligence.

ArcGIS Server is available for the Microsoft Windows .NET Framework and the Java Platform. ArcGIS Server ships in three functional editions, Basic, Standard, and Advanced, with the Advanced edition providing the most functionality. ArcGIS Server Basic edition is used primarily to manage multiuser geodatabases and geodata services. Both ArcGIS Server Standard and Advanced editions support the following types of Web services: Feature (for Web editing), Geodata (for geodatabase replication), Geocode (for finding and displaying addresses/locations on a map), Geometry (for geometric calculations such as calculating areas and lengths), Geoprocessing (for scientific modeling and spatial data analysis), Globe (for 3D and globe rendering), Image (for serving raster data and providing control over imagery delivery, such as satellite imagery or orthophotos), Keyhole Markup Language (KML), Map (for cached and optimized map services), Mobile (for running services on field devices), Network Analyst (for routing, closest facility location, or service area analysis), Search (for enterprise search of GIS assets), Web Coverage Service (WCS), Web Feature Service (WFS) and Transactional Web Feature Service (WFS-T), and Web Map Service (WMS).

In addition, ArcGIS Server editions are available at two levels, scaled according to capacity: Workgroup and Enterprise. ArcGIS Server Workgroup can be deployed on a single machine to support a maximum of 10 simultaneous connections to a multiuser geodatabase. With Workgroup, the multiuser geodatabase storage capacity cannot exceed ten gigabytes. ArcGIS Server Enterprise supports distributed deployment of ArcGIS Server components, unlimited simultaneous connections to a multiuser geodatabase, and unlimited multiuser geodatabase storage capacity.

ArcGIS Server is also used to manage multiuser geodatabases. Multiuser geodatabases leverage ArcSDE technology, implemented on a relational database management system (RDBMS). ArcGIS Server Enterprise supports IBM Db2, IBM Informix Dynamic Server, Microsoft SQL Server, Oracle, and PostgreSQL. ArcGIS Server Workgroup supports Microsoft SQL Server Express R1 and R2.

ArcGIS Server is used by the software developer and Web developer to create Web, desktop, and mobile applications. Esri provides developers with application development framework (ADF) and application programming interface (API) including, ArcGIS API for JavaScript, ArcGIS API for Flex, ArcGIS API for Microsoft Silverlight/WPF, ArcGIS API for iOS, BAO API, BAO for iOS, as well as the ArcGIS Mobile software development kit (SDK), and ArcGIS Server REST and SOAP APIs.

== Product history ==
ArcGIS Server version history
Version	Released
9.0	2004-05-01
9.0.1	2005-01-01
9.1	2005-05-01
9.2	2006-11-01
9.3	2008-06-01
9.3.1	2009-04-01
10.0	2010-06-30
10.1	2012-06-11
10.2	2013-07-30
10.2.1	2014-01-07
10.2.2	2014-04-15
10.3	2014-12-10
10.3.1	2015-05-13
10.4	2016-02-18
10.4.1	2016-05-31
10.5	2016-12-15
10.5.1	2017-06-29
10.6	2018-01-17
10.6.1	2018-07-17
10.7	2019-03-21
10.7.1	2019-06-27
10.8	2020-02-20
10.8.1	2020-07-28
10.9	2021-05-06
10.9.1	2021-11-18
11.0	2022-07-22
11.1	2023-04-20
11.2	2023-11-09
11.3	2024-05-23
11.4	2024-11-07
11.5	2025-05-22
