= Esri International User Conference =

Geographic information system technology event

The Esri International User Conference (Esri UC) is an event dedicated to geographic information system (GIS) technology. It is held annually in the United States, usually for one week in July at the San Diego Convention Center in San Diego, California. The Esri UC dates back to 1981. In 2008, conference attendance grew to more than 14,000 attendees.

The 2025 Esri User Conference took place from July 14–18, 2025, at the San Diego Convention Center in California. Themed "GIS—Integrating Everything, Everywhere," the event featured over 700 technical sessions, the launch of new AI tools, and massive industry showcases.Conference HighlightsThe 2025 conference offered a mix of new product rollouts, high-profile user stories, and networking opportunities:Key Announcements: President Jack Dangermond opened the plenary with a strong focus on AI integration, announcing new no-code tools like ArcGIS Data Pipelines and the beta release of the ArcGIS XR Viewer.Plenary Presentations: Attendees heard from organizations leveraging spatial mapping at scale, including San Francisco International Airport, CVS Health, and CalFire.Expo & Socials: The event featured a packed exhibit floor, the massive Map Gallery, and evening social events including a Thursday night party at Petco Park.Attendance: The conference drew over 20,000 in-person attendees, paired with thousands more who participated virtually.

== History ==
The first Esri UC took place in 1981 in Redlands, California, at Esri Headquarters, with 15 users, and held annually in Palm Springs, from 1986 to 1996. Since 1997, the conference has been hosted in San Diego. The conference was the brainchild of Esri President and Founder Jack Dangermond.

Keynote Speakers

Prior to 1986, no keynote speakers were featured.

- 1986 – Dr. Duane Marble, Professor of Geography and Computer Science, State University of New York, Buffalo
- 1987 – Dr. Roger Tomlinson, the primary originator of modern, computerized GIS (known as "the father of GIS" )
- 1988 – Dr. Robert Aangeebrug, executive director, American Association of Geographers
- 1989 – Dr. Peter Thacher, assistant secretary general, United Nations
- 1990 – David Andere from the Kenya Rangeland Ecological Monitoring Unit; David Rhind, geographer and professor, Birkbeck College, University of London; Dr. Kent Smith, Esri consultant; Otto Simonette, director, United Nations Environment Program; and Nancy Tosta, staff director, Federal Geographic Data Committee, and special assistant to the Secretary of the Interior
- 1991 – Ralph Nader, attorney, author, lecturer, consumer advocate, political activist, and former independent and Green Party candidate for president of the United States
- 1992 – Dr. Paul R. Ehrlich, author of the book The Population Bomb
- 1993 – Dr. James Burke, author of the book The Day the Universe Changed and the PBS television series ‘Connections’
- 1994 – Dr. Edward O. Wilson, the Pellegrino University Research Professor in Entomology for the Department of Organismic and Evolutionary Biology at Harvard University
- 1995 – John Kenneth Galbraith, economist, Harvard University
- 1996 – Bruce Babbitt, Secretary of the Interior
- 1997 – Dr. Ian McHarg, professor emeritus of landscape architecture and regional planning, Harvard University, author of the book Design with Nature
- 1998 – Dr. Carl Steinitz, professor of landscape architecture and planning, graduate school of design, Harvard University Graphics Lab; Dr. Hasso Plattner, cofounder of SAP AG, a multinational enterprise software development and consulting corporation
- 1999 – Dr. Sylvia Earle, oceanographer and former chief scientist for the United States National Oceanic and Atmospheric Administration (NOAA)
- 2000 – Dr. Charles Groat, director of United States Geological Survey (USGS)
- 2001 – Michael Fay, ecologist, conservationist, and National Geographic Society Explorer
- 2002 – Cynthia Moss, conservationist and wildlife researcher and writer who started the Amboseli Elephant Project at Amboseli National Park in Kenya
- 2003 – Peter Hillary, adventurer and Mt. Everest climber, son of Sir Edmund Hillary
- 2004 – Dr. Rita Colwell, president, National Science Foundation (NSF)
- 2005 – Dr. Jane Goodall, anthropologist and chimpanzee researcher
- 2006 – Bob Kerrey, former Democratic governor and senator of Nebraska and president of The New School university in New York City
- 2007 – Wangari Maathai, Nobel Laureate and founder of "The Green Belt Movement"
- 2008 – Dr. Peter H. Raven, director, Missouri Botanical Garden
- 2009 – Hernando de Soto Polar, economist, author, and president of the Institute for Liberty and Democracy; Willie Smits, biologist, chairman of the Masarang Foundation, and founder of the Borneo Orangutan Survival
- 2010 – Richard Saul Wurman, architect, graphic designer, and expert in how to make complex information understandable.
- 2011 – Jacqueline McGlade, Executive Director European Environment Agency.
- 2012 – Julia Marton-Lefèvre, Director General of the International Union for Conservation of Nature.
- 2013 – Sam Pitroda, Business Executive, Indian Technology Policy Advisor.
- 2014 – Penny Pritzker, United States Secretary of Commerce and Dr. Kathleen Sullivan, Under Secretary of Commerce for the National Oceanic and Atmospheric Administration.
- 2015 – Martin O'Malley, Governor of Maryland.
- 2016 – Andrea Wulf, historian, author.
- 2017 – Geoffrey West, theoretical physicist, author.
- 2018 – Juan Enriquez, Managing Director of Excel Venture Management.
- 2019 – Jane Goodall, primalogist and anthropologist, and E.O. Wilson, biologist and author.
- 2022 – Ronan Donovan, National Geographic Explorer & Deanne Criswell, FEMA Administrator.
- 2023 – Dr. Richard W. Spinard, NOAA Administrator.
- 2024– Tim Walz, Governor of Minnesota.
- 2025 – Kirk Johnson, paleontologist, author and director of the Smithsonian National Museum of Natural History.
- 2026 – Kristine Tompkins, president and cofounder of Tompkins Conservation, former CEO of Patagonia.
