= ArcGIS =

Geographic information system maintained by Esri

- ArcGIS Logo

- A map of the Gaza Strip on ArcGIS Pro 2.8, running on Windows 10
- Developer: Esri
- Release: December 27, 1999; 26 years ago
- Stable release: Enterprise: 11.0, Desktop: 10.8.2, Pro: 3.0.1 / Enterprise: June 23, 2022; 4 years ago, Desktop: December 9, 2021; 4 years ago, Pro: August 11, 2022; 4 years ago
- Written in: C++
- Operating system: Enterprise supports: Windows Server 2016 and later; RHEL 8 Update 5, SLES 12 Service Pack 5, SLES 15 Service Pack 3, Ubuntu 18.04 LTS, Ubuntu 20.04 LTS, Oracle Linux 8 Update 5; Desktop: Windows 7 SP1 and later, Windows Server 2008 R2 and later; Pro: Windows 8.1, 10, 11, Windows Server 2012 and later;
- Type: Geographic information system
- License: Proprietary commercial software
- Website: www.esri.com/en-us/arcgis/geospatial-platform/overview

ArcGIS is a family of client, server and online geographic information system (GIS) software developed and maintained by Esri.

ArcGIS was first released in 1982 as ARC/INFO, a command line-based GIS. ARC/INFO was later merged into ArcGIS Desktop, which was eventually superseded by ArcGIS Pro in 2015. Additionally, ArcGIS Server is a server-side GIS and geodata sharing software.

== Product history ==
ArcGIS Desktop version history
Version	Released
8.0	1999-12-27
8.0.1	2000-01-13
8.1	2001-05-01
8.2	2002-05-10
8.3	2003-02-10
9.0	2004-05-11
9.1	2005-05-25
9.2	2006-11-14
9.3	2008-06-25
9.3.1	2009-04-28
10.0	2010-06-29
10.1	2012-06-11
10.2	2013-07-30
10.2.1	2014-01-07
10.2.2	2014-04-15
10.3	2014-12-10
10.3.1	2015-05-13
10.4	2016-02-18
10.4.1	2016-05-31
10.5	2016-12-15
10.5.1	2017-06-29
10.6	2018-01-17
10.6.1	2018-07-16
10.7	2019-03-21
10.7.1	2019-06-27
10.8	2020-02-20
10.8.1	2020-07-28
10.8.2	2021-12-05

Prior to the ArcGIS suite, Esri had focused its software development on the command line Arc/INFO workstation program and several graphical user interface-based products such as the ArcView GIS 3.x desktop program. Other Esri products included MapObjects, a programming library for developers, and ArcSDE as a relational database management system. The various products had branched out into multiple source trees and did not integrate well with one another. In January 1997, Esri decided to revamp its GIS software platform, creating a single integrated software architecture.

=== ArcMap 8.0 ===
In late 1999, Esri released ArcMap 8.0, which ran on the Microsoft Windows operating system. ArcGIS combined the visual user-interface aspect of ArcView GIS 3.x interface with some of the power from the Arc/INFO version 7.2 workstation. This pairing resulted in a new software suite called ArcGIS including the command-line ArcInfo workstation (v8.0) and a new graphical user interface application called ArcMap (v8.0). ArcMap incorporated some of the functionality of ArcInfo with a more intuitive interface, as well as a file management application called ArcCatalog (v8.0). The release of the ArcMap constituted a major change in Esri's software offerings, aligning all their client and server products under one software architecture known as ArcGIS, developed using Microsoft Windows COM standards. While the interface and names of ArcMap 8.0 are similar to later versions of ArcGIS Desktop, they are different products. ArcGIS 8.1 replaced ArcMap 8.0 in the product line but was not an update to it.

=== ArcGIS Desktop 8.1 to 8.3 ===
ArcGIS 8.1 was unveiled at the Esri International User Conference in 2000. ArcGIS 8.1 was officially released on April 24, 2001. This new application included three extensions: 3D Analyst, Spatial Analyst, and GeoStatistical Analyst. These three extensions had become very powerful and popular in ArcView GIS 3.x product line. ArcGIS 8.1 also added the ability to access data online, directly from the Geography Network site or other ArcIMS map services. ArcGIS 8.3 was introduced in 2002, adding topology to geodatabases, which was a feature originally available only with ArcInfo coverages.

One major difference is the programming (scripting) languages available to customize or extend the software to suit particular user needs. In the transition to ArcGIS, Esri dropped support of its application-specific scripting languages, Avenue and the ARC Macro Language (AML), in favor of Visual Basic for Applications scripting and open access to ArcGIS components using the Microsoft COM standards. ArcGIS is designed to store data in a proprietary RDBMS format, known as geodatabase. ArcGIS 8.x introduced other new features, including on-the-fly map projections, and annotation in the database.

=== ArcGIS 9.x ===
ArcGIS 9 was released in May 2004, which included ArcGIS Server and ArcGIS Engine for developers. The ArcGIS 9 release includes a geoprocessing environment that allows execution of traditional GIS processing tools (such as clipping, overlay, and spatial analysis) interactively or from any scripting language that supports COM standards. Although the most popular of these is Python, others have been used, especially Perl and VBScript. ArcGIS 9 includes a visual programming environment, similar to ERDAS IMAGINE's Model Maker (released in 1994, v8.0.2). The Esri version is called ModelBuilder and as does the ERDAS IMAGINE version allows users to graphically link geoprocessing tools into new tools called models. These models can be executed directly or exported to scripting languages which can then execute in batch mode (launched from a command line), or they can undergo further editing to add branching or looping.

On June 26, 2008, Esri released ArcGIS 9.3. The new version of ArcGIS Desktop has new modeling tools and geostatistical error tracking features, while ArcGIS Server has improved performance, and support for role-based security. There also are new JavaScript APIs that can be used to create mashups, and integrated with either Google Maps or Microsoft Virtual Earth.

At the 2008 Esri Developers Summit, there was little emphasis on ArcIMS, except for one session on transitioning from ArcIMS to ArcGIS Server-based applications, indicating a change in focus for Esri with ArcGIS 9.3 for web-based mapping applications.

In May 2009, Esri released ArcGIS 9.3.1, which improved the performance of dynamic map publishing and introduced better sharing of geographic information.

=== ArcGIS 10.x ===
In 2010, Esri announced that the prospective version 9.4 would become version 10 and would ship in the second quarter of 2010.

The ArcGIS 10.3 release included ArcGIS Pro 1.0, which became available in January 2015.

On October 21, 2020, Esri publicly announced that this would be the last release of ArcGIS Desktop. Its products, including ArcMap, will be supported until March 1, 2026. This announcement confirmed predictions that ArcGIS Pro (and related products) was planned to be a complete replacement for ArcMap.

ArcGIS Server was renamed to ArcGIS Enterprise at the 10.5 release, wherein ArcGIS Server, Portal for ArcGIS, ArcGIS Data Store and ArcGIS Web Adaptor are identified as components of ArcGIS Enterprise.

=== ArcGIS Urban ===
ArcGIS Urban is a commercial urban planning application developed by the Esri R&D Center Zurich, designed to support urban planners, architects, and stakeholders in managing urban development projects, visualizing future growth, and evaluating the impact of planning decisions. The application allows users to model their city in 3D, and study plans and projects in the context of zoning and land-use regulations, as well as custom metrics such as population, energy use and fiscal implications.

The first version of ArcGIS Urban was announced in 2018, and released on 1 July 2019 for ArcGIS Online. The ArcGIS online version of ArcGIS Urban releases new versions 3 times per year.

On May 23, 2024, ArcGIS Urban was released as part of ArcGIS Enterprise 11.3, enabling users to host the application and data on-premise instead of on the cloud. ArcGIS Urban also has a GraphQL API, which enables users to manage all the data in the application programmatically. The first version of the Urban API was released on 29 June 2022.

3D meshes that are created from LiDAR data, drone footage and aerial imagery using ArcGIS Reality can be used in ArcGIS Urban to visualise plans and projects with a more realistic context. Plans that are created in ArcGIS Urban can also be opened in CityEngine, where more detailed urban design work can be done.

=== ArcGIS Enterprise 11.x ===
ArcGIS Enterprise 11 was released on June 23, 2022, just prior to the annual User Conference held in San Diego. ArcGIS Enterprise 11.0 does not support any ArcGIS 10.x and older products and was also accompanied by the release of ArcGIS Pro 3.0.

=== ArcGIS Online ===
ArcGIS Online is a web application allowing sharing and search of geographic information, as well as content published by Esri, ArcGIS users, and other authoritative data providers. It allows users to create and join groups, and control access to items shared publicly or within groups.

A number of apps dedicated to specific functionalities have been released in as part of the ArcGIS Online Ecosystem. ArcGIS Field Maps was released in 2020 to allowing users to collect and display data on their mobile devices in real time. Other apps include ArcGIS Data Pipelines, Dashboards, Experience Builder, StoryMaps, QuickCapture, Solutions, Survey123 and others. There are also several apps introduced to promote data interoperability with other platforms such as ArcGIS for AutoCAD, Microsoft 365, Excel, PowerBI, SharePoint, Teams and Adobe Creative Cloud.

=== ArcGIS Pro ===
ArcGIS Pro is a 64-bit GIS software that is the more modern version of ArcGIS Desktop. Unlike ArcGIS Desktop, the ArcCatalog and ArcMap functionalities are accessed through the same application, most commonly through the Catalog pane. The graphics requirements for ArcGIS Pro are considerably higher than for ArcGIS Desktop in order to support the upgraded visualization. ArcGIS Pro also supports streamlined workflows that involve publishing and consuming feature layers using ArcGIS Online. With the release of ArcGIS Pro 3.0 in June, 2022 all *.aprx project files can be read by version 3.0; however, if the project is saved it will render the project file to be incompatible with version 2.9.x and earlier.

ArcGIS Pro 1.0 was released in January 2015.

ArcGIS Pro 2.6 was released in July 2020. Noted features added included:

- Voxel layers are 3D representations of data over space and time and are saved in a netCDF file. Voxel layers are used to visualize complex layers such as atmospheric and oceanic data or space-time cubes. These layers are used to analyze spatial patterns of data in specific situations. Voxel layers generally encompass extensive areas and slices can be used to delineate areas of the layer that need further analysis. Voxels can be shown with other geospatial data to further visualize the study area.
- Trace networks are used to evaluate connectivity models like railroads. Edges and junctions along with network attributes are used to understand the movement of goods through the network. The connectedness of the network is established based on the concurrence of geometric features. Trace networks are used alongside network topology to make more tools available such as trace and validation.
- Interactive suitability analysis using the new Suitability Modeler is a way to figure out an optimal location for a building project or other similar initiative. This is done by feeding the model with certain criteria to find areas that would be suitable for the project. The suitability modeler is an interactive way to visualize and assess the suitability model. The suitability modeler allows a user to see how each criterion changes the model and make a more educated decision for the project. Feedback is also given from the modeler to help the user understand the model better.
- Graphics layers store geometric features and do not need to be in a feature class to visualize. Graphics layers go on top of other layers on a map to better illustrate the purpose of the map. Graphics layers are used to add extra information to map such as text or highlight important features. There can be multiple graphics layers in a map and can be grouped together.
- Parcel adjustment using least squares adjustment is way to adjust parcel fabric to find the optimal position for parcel fabric points. The parcel fabric is a network that the distance of lines and angles between points. There are two types of least squares adjustment for parcel fabric. These are free network adjustment and weighted/constrained adjustment. Free network adjustment uses no control points and the layer is adjusted for the measurements to be most optimal, and Weighted/constrained adjustment uses control points and the layer is adjusted within the scope of the scope of the points. A least squares adjustment can be run after a new parcel-fabric is created or new data is added to an existing parcel fabric.
- Link analysis develops a network of connected of objects and determines the patterns that exist. Link analysis is done to find what patterns in a network are most important and finds new patterns that were previously unknown. Link analysis uses link charts to visualize the network. Link charts represent the objects in a network using nodes and these nodes can be people, buildings, or devices. Objects are usually moving such as people or vehicles, and link charts show how they interact with each other over both space and time. Link analysis is done to better understand the network. This is done by finding the shortest path between nodes, showing what nodes have the strongest connections, and finding the nodes that are nearest to each other.
- Project recovery is an automatic way of saving a project so work is not lost. When ArcGIS pro is opened it will prompt the user if they want to keep all the unsaved changes that were backed up. The backups are also stored in the .backups folder in the project home. The interval of time that the project saves automatically can be determined by using the backup settings.

== Functionality ==
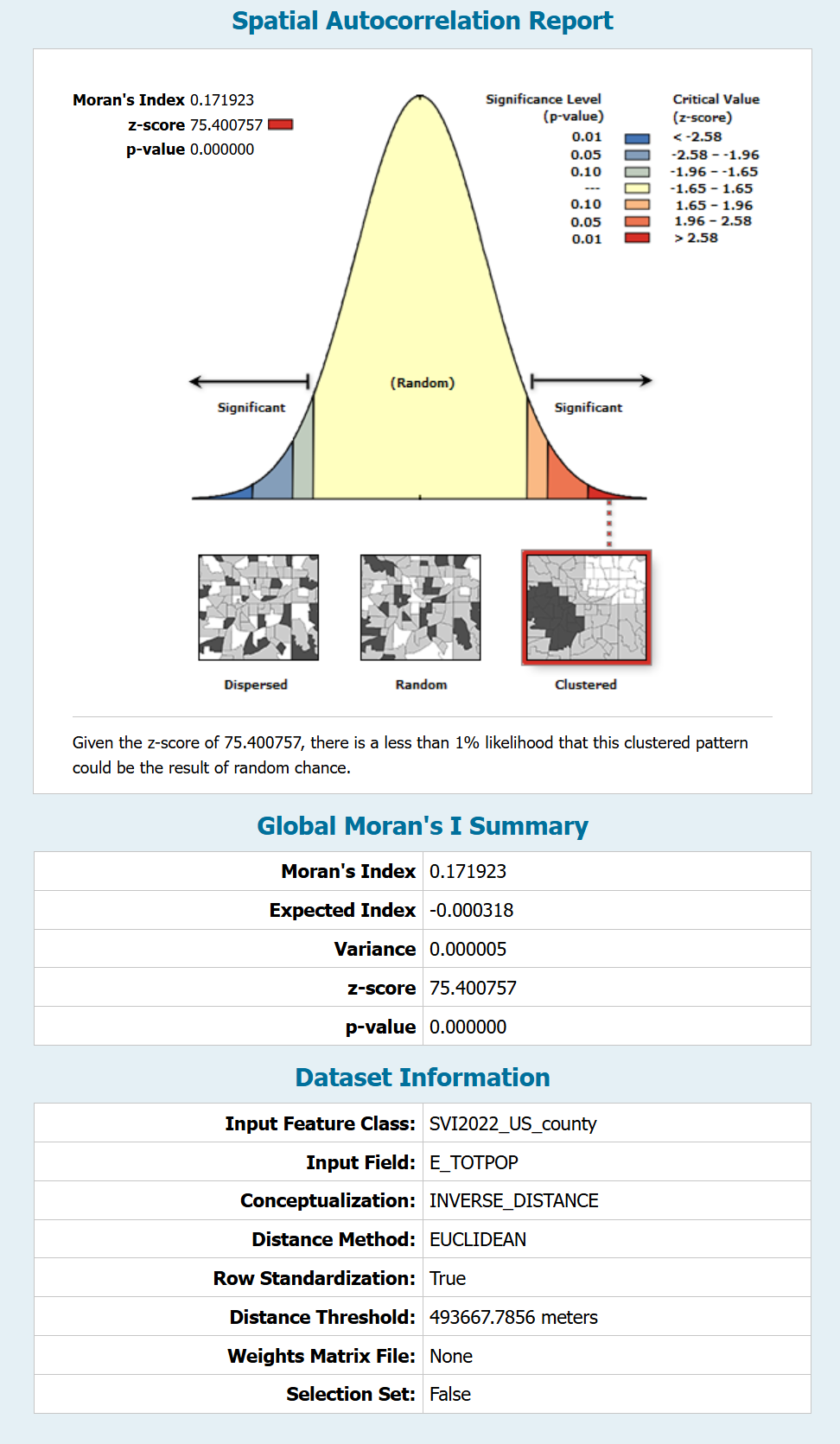
Spatial Autocorrelation Report generated by ArcGIS Pro for 2022 U.S. county population.

=== Data formats ===
Older Esri products, including ArcView 3.x, worked with data in the shapefile format. ArcInfo Workstation handled coverages, which stored topology information about the spatial data. Coverages, which were introduced in 1981 when ArcInfo was first released, have limitations in how they handle types of features. Some features, such as roads with street intersections or overpasses and underpasses, should be handled differently from other types of features.

ArcGIS is built around a geodatabase, which uses an object–relational database approach for storing spatial data. A geodatabase is a "container" for holding datasets, tying together the spatial features with attributes. The geodatabase can also contain topology information, and can model behavior of features, such as road intersections, with rules on how features relate to one another. When working with geodatabases, it is important to understand feature classes which are a set of features, represented with points, lines, or polygons. With shapefiles, each file can only handle one type of feature. A geodatabase can store multiple feature classes or type of features within one file.

Geodatabases in ArcGIS can be stored in three different ways – as a "file geodatabase", a "personal geodatabase", or an "enterprise geodatabase" (formerly known as an SDE or ArcSDE geodatabase). Introduced at 9.2, the file geodatabase stores information in a folder named with a .gdb extension. The insides look similar to that of a coverage but is not, in fact, a coverage. Similar to the personal geodatabase, the file geodatabase only supports a single editor. However, unlike the personal geodatabase, there is virtually no size limit. By default, any single table cannot exceed 1TB, but this can be changed. Personal geodatabases store data in Microsoft Access files, using a BLOB field to store the geometry data. The OGR library is able to handle this file type, to convert it to other file formats. Database administration tasks for personal geodatabases, such as managing users and creating backups, can be done through ArcCatalog and ArcGIS Pro. Personal geodatabases, which are based on Microsoft Access, run only on Microsoft Windows and have a 2 gigabyte size limit. Enterprise (multi-user) geodatabases sit on top of high-end DBMS such as PostgreSQL, Oracle, Microsoft SQL Server, IBM Db2 and Informix to handle database management aspects, while ArcGIS deals with spatial data management. Enterprise level geodatabases support database replication, versioning and transaction management, and are cross-platform compatible, able to run on Linux, Windows, and Solaris.

Also released at 9.2 is the personal SDE database that operates with SQL Server Express. Personal SDE databases do not support multi-user editing, but do support versioning and disconnected editing. Microsoft limits SQL Server Express databases to 4GB.

ArcGIS Pro's 64-bit version does not support the personal geodatabase format but can convert them into supported formats using geoprocessing tools.

=== ArcGIS Desktop ===
==== Product levels ====
ArcGIS Desktop is available at different product levels, with increasing functionality.

- ArcReader (freeware, viewer) is a basic data viewer for maps and GIS data published in the proprietary Esri format using ArcGIS Publisher. The software also provides some basic tools for map viewing, printing and querying of spatial data. ArcReader is included with any of the ArcGIS suite of products, and is also available for free to download. ArcReader only works with pre-authored published map files, created with ArcGIS Publisher.
- ArcGIS Desktop Basic, formerly known as ArcView, is the entry level of ArcGIS licensing. With ArcView, one is able to view and edit GIS data held in flat files, or view data stored in a relational database management system by accessing it through ArcSDE. One can also create layered maps and perform basic spatial analysis.
- ArcGIS Desktop Standard, formerly known as ArcEditor, is the midlevel software suite designed for advanced editing of spatial data in shapefiles and geodatabases. It provides tools for the creation of map and spatial data used in GIS, including the ability of editing geodatabase files and data, multiuser geodatabase editing, versioning, raster data editing and vectorization, advanced vector data editing, managing coverages, coordinate geometry (COGO), and editing geometric networks. ArcEditor is not intended for advanced spatial analysis.
- ArcGIS Desktop Advanced, formerly known as ArcInfo, allows users the most flexibility and control in "all aspects of data building, modeling, analysis, and map display." ArcInfo includes increased capability in the areas of spatial analysis, geoprocessing, data management, and others.

Other desktop GIS software include ArcGIS Explorer and ArcGIS Engine. ArcGIS Explorer is a GIS viewer which can work as a client for ArcGIS Server, ArcIMS, ArcWeb Services and Web Map Service (WMS).

==== Components ====
ArcGIS Desktop consists of several integrated applications, including ArcMap, ArcCatalog, ArcToolbox, ArcScene, ArcGlobe, and ArcGIS Pro. ArcCatalog is the data management application, used to browse datasets and files on one's computer, database, or other sources. In addition to showing what data is available, ArcCatalog also allows users to preview the data on a map. ArcCatalog also provides the ability to view and manage metadata for spatial datasets. ArcMap is the application used to view, edit and query geospatial data, and create maps. The ArcMap interface has two main sections, including a table of contents on the left and the data frames which display the map. Items in the table of contents correspond with layers on the map. ArcToolbox contains geoprocessing, data conversion, and analysis tools, along with much of the functionality in ArcInfo. It is also possible to use batch processing with ArcToolbox, for frequently repeated tasks. ArcScene is an application which allows the user to view their GIS data in 3D and is available with the 3D Analyst License. In the layer properties of ArcScene there is an Extrusion function which allows the user to exaggerate features three dimension-ally. ArcGlobe is another one of ArcGIS's 3D visualization applications available with the 3D Analyst License. ArcGlobe is a 3D visualization application that allows you to view large amounts of GIS data on a globe surface. The ArcGIS Pro application was added to ArcGIS Desktop in 2015 February. It had the combined capabilities of the other integrated applications and was built as a fully 64-bit software application. ArcGIS Pro has ArcPy Python scripting for database programming.

==== Extensions ====
There are a number of software extensions that can be added to ArcGIS Desktop that provide added functionality, including 3D Analyst, Spatial Analyst, Network Analyst, Survey Analyst, Tracking Analyst, and Geostatistical Analyst. Advanced map labeling is available with the Maplex extension, as an add-on to ArcView and ArcEditor and is bundled with ArcInfo. Numerous extensions have also been developed by third parties, such as the MapSpeller spell-checker, ST-Links PgMap, XTools Pro and MAP2PDF for creating georeferenced pdfs (GeoPDF), ERDAS' Image Analysis and Stereo Analyst for ArcGIS, and ISM's PurVIEW, which converts Arc- desktops into precise stereo-viewing windows to work with geo-referenced stereoscopic image models for accurate geodatabase-direct editing or feature digitizing. ArcGIS Pro can use the FME engine and workflows as part of the data interoperability extension.

=== Address locator ===
An address locator is a dataset in ArcGIS that stores the address attributes, associated indexes, and rules that define the process for translating nonspatial descriptions of places, such as street addresses, into spatial data that can be displayed as features on a map. An address locator contains a snapshot of the reference data used for geocoding, and parameters for standardizing addresses, searching for match locations, and creating output. Address locator files have a .loc file extension. In ArcGIS 8.3 and previous versions, an address locator was called a geocoding service.

=== Other products ===
ArcGIS Mobile and ArcPad are products designed for mobile devices. ArcGIS Mobile is a software development kit for developers to use to create applications for mobile devices, such as smartphones or tablet PCs. If connected to the Internet, mobile applications can connect to ArcGIS Server to access or update data. ArcGIS Mobile is only available at the Enterprise level.

Server GIS products include ArcIMS (web mapping server), ArcGIS Server and ArcGIS Image Server. As with ArcGIS Desktop, ArcGIS Server is available at different product levels, including Basic, Standard, and Advanced Editions. ArcGIS Server comes with SQL Server Express DBMS embedded and can work with enterprise DBMS such as SQL Server Enterprise and Oracle. The Esri Developer Network (EDN) includes ArcObjects and other tools for building custom software applications, and ArcGIS Engine provides a programming interface for developers.

For non-commercial purposes, Esri offers a home use program with a lower annual license fee.

== Developer products ==
=== ArcGIS Engine ===
ArcGIS Engine is an ArcGIS software engine, a developer product for creating custom GIS desktop applications.

ArcGIS Engine provides application programming interfaces (APIs) for COM, .NET, Java, and C++ for the Windows, Linux, and Solaris platforms. The APIs include documentation and a series of high-level visual components to ease building ArcGIS applications.

ArcGIS Engine includes the core set of components, ArcObjects, from which ArcGIS Desktop products are built. With ArcGIS Engine one can build stand-alone applications or extend existing applications for both GIS and non-GIS users. The ArcGIS Engine distribution additionally includes utilities, samples, and documentation.

One ArcGIS Engine Runtime or ArcGIS Desktop license per computer is necessary.

=== ArcGIS Web Mapping APIs ===
ArcGIS Web Mapping APIs are APIs for several languages, allowing users to build and deploy applications that include GIS functionality and Web services from ArcGIS Online and ArcGIS Server. Adobe Flex, JavaScript and Microsoft Silverlight are supported for applications that can be embedded in web pages or launched as stand-alone Web applications. Flex, Adobe Air and Windows Presentation Foundation (WPF) are supported for desktop applications.

== Sales ==
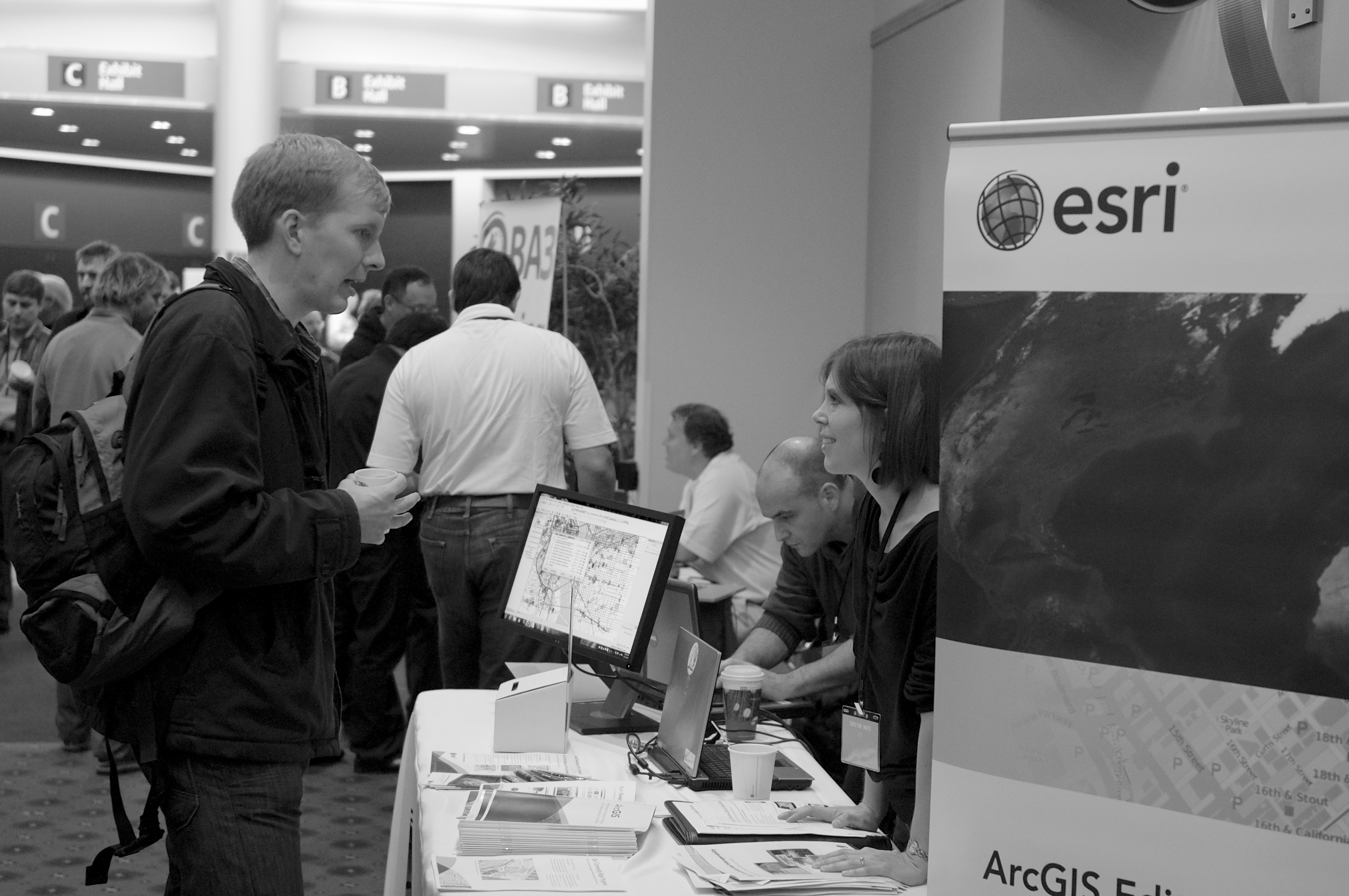
Esri representatives demonstrating ArcGIS features at an OpenStreetMap convention.

ArcGIS Desktop products and ArcPad are available with a single-use license. Most products are also available with concurrent-use license, while development server licenses and other types of software licenses are available for other products. Single-use products can be purchased online from the Esri Store, while all ArcGIS products are available through a sales representative or reseller. Annual software maintenance and support is also available for ArcGIS. While there are alternative products available from vendors such as MapInfo, Maptitude, AutoCAD Map 3D and open-source QGIS, Esri has a dominant share of the GIS software market, estimated in 2015 at 43%.

== Criticisms ==
Issues with ArcGIS include perceived high prices for the products, proprietary formats, and difficulties of porting data between Esri and other GIS software.

== See also ==
- ArcView 3.x Covering the older version of ArcView
- ArcView The new entry-level licensing level of ArcGIS
- GIS in environmental contamination
- Geographic information system software
