= Internet Map Server =

Type of server that provides maps and geoservices

Internet Map Server (IMS) provide maps through the Internet usually as images. One standard specification for such a server is the OGC Web Map Service.
