= ArcInfo =

Geographic information system

- Developer: Esri
- Initial release: 1982
- Stable release: 10.0 / 2010
- Operating system: Windows, Solaris, AIX, Tru64 UNIX
- Available in: English
- Type: GIS
- License: Proprietary
- Website: ArcInfo Workstation -- Previous Versions

ArcInfo (formerly ARC/INFO) is a full-featured geographic information system produced by Esri, and is the highest level of licensing (and therefore functionality) in the ArcGIS Desktop product line. It was originally a command-line based system. The command-line processing abilities are now available through the GUI of the ArcGIS Desktop product.

== History ==
=== ARC/INFO ===
ESRI launched the first version of ARC/INFO - which it claims as "the very first modern GIS" - in 1982 on minicomputers. The name refers to its architecture as a geographic information system composed of:

1. geographic input, processing, and output tools ("ARC") with
2. a complementary, but separate database ("INFO")

The early releases of ARC/INFO comprised a set of FORTRAN programs linked together and accessed through a command-line interface built with the scripting language of the minicomputer (CPL on PRIMOS, DCL on VMS, etc.). The software was built under a paradigm of tools that could be used together within a command-line interface to perform GIS database development, geoprocessing, and output functions.

ESRI added subsystems for surface processing ("TIN") network analysis ("Network"), and survey data processing ("Cogo").

The release of ARC/INFO 4.0 included the advent of an "Arc executive" which processed commands with a new command-interpreter developed in FORTRAN and compiled for each platform, for performance and stability. The Arc Executive allowed the support of a command language specific to ARC/INFO: the ARC Macro Language (AML). This allows users automate input to the command line, and supports simple graphical user interfaces (menus and forms) for application-specific tools and applications. AML was largely based on CPL, the system scripting language of the original ARC/INFO development platform, PRIMOS. AML applications could be written to execute unmodified on all platforms supported by ARC/INFO.

As computing shifted towards Unix and Windows, ESRI followed by launching ARC/INFO on both platforms. The development platform for ARC/INFO moved to Sun Solaris at version 5.0, and to Windows at version 7.1.

ESRI released a subset of ARC/INFO functionality as PC ARC/INFO for MS-DOS in 1987 and later a version for Windows using a dBase tables (instead of INFO) for tabular data and a 'Simple Macro Language' (SML).

==== GRID ====
ARC/INFO 6.0 added a major subsystem (GRID) for raster processing. The underlying raster processing software framework (and "ESRI GRID" raster data format) later provided the code base for ArcView 3.x Spatial Analyst and ArcGIS Spatial Analyst.

=== ArcInfo ===
ESRI underwent a major change in its GIS product family when it released ArcGIS 8.0 late in 1999. With this release, ARC/INFO was discontinued and its code base largely frozen. ArcGIS was a multi-scale architecture, with the Desktop product released at three licensing levels: ArcView; ArcEditor; and ArcInfo.

The ArcInfo license is billed by ESRI as "Professional GIS", allowing users the most flexibility and control in "all aspects of data building, modeling, analysis, and map display".

ArcInfo Desktop continued to be shipped with the older command-line software, now named "ArcInfo Workstation"—with access to coverage processing tools provided through the ArcGIS Coverage toolbox. Most ArcInfo Workstation functionality missing from ArcInfo Desktop at the 8.0 release was gradually implemented within the ArcGIS geoprocessing framework, and was finally completed with the release of ArcGIS 10.0 in 2011.

== Final release and deprecation ==
ESRI released ArcInfo Workstation 10.0 (along with ArcGIS 10.0) in late 2010. This final release supported Windows (XP, Vista, Win 7, Server 2003 and 2008) and Solaris 10 (SPARC).

In 2012, Esri deprecated the use of the term ArcInfo as a licensing option for ArcGIS. The most advanced license for ArcGIS Desktop is now known as "ArcGIS Advanced".
