= Shapefile =

Geospatial vector data format

- A vector map, with points, polylines and polygons
- Filename extension: .shp, .shx, .dbf
- Internet media type: application/vnd.shp
- Developed by: Esri
- Type of format: GIS
- Standard: Shapefile Technical Description

The shapefile format is a geospatial vector data format for geographic information system (GIS) software. It is developed and regulated by Esri as a mostly open specification for data interoperability among Esri and other GIS software products. The shapefile format can spatially describe vector features: points, lines, and polygons, representing, for example, water wells, rivers, and lakes. Each item usually has attributes that describe it, such as name or temperature.

== Overview ==
The shapefile format is a digital vector storage format for storing geographic location and associated attribute information. This format lacks the capacity to store topological information. The shapefile format was introduced with ArcView GIS version 2 in the early 1990s. It is now possible to read and write geographical datasets using the shapefile format with a wide variety of software.

The shapefile format stores the geometry as primitive geometric shapes like points, lines, and polygons. These shapes, together with data attributes that are linked to each shape, create the representation of the geographic data. The term "shapefile" is quite common, but the format consists of a collection of files with a common filename prefix, stored in the same directory. The three mandatory files have filename extensions .shp, .shx, and .dbf. The actual shapefile relates specifically to the .shp file, but alone is incomplete for distribution as the other supporting files are required. In line with the ESRI Shapefile Technical Description, legacy GIS software may expect that the filename prefix be limited to eight characters to conform to the DOS 8.3 filename convention, though modern software applications accept files with longer names.

=== Mandatory files ===
.shp
Shape format; the feature geometry itself.
Content-type: application/vnd.shp
.shx
Shape index format; a positional index of the feature geometry to allow seeking forwards and backwards quickly.
Content-type: application/vnd.shp.shx
.dbf
Attribute format; columnar attributes for each shape, in dBase IV format.
Content-type: application/vnd.dbf

=== Other files ===
- .prj — projection description, using a well-known text representation of coordinate reference systems {content-type: text/plain OR application/text}
- .sbn and .sbx — a spatial index of the features {content-type: application/vnd.shp}
- .fbn and .fbx — a spatial index of the features that are read-only {content-type: application/vnd.shp}
- .ain and .aih — an attribute index of the active fields in a table {content-type: application/vnd.shp}
- .ixs — a geocoding index for read-write datasets {content-type: application/vnd.shp}
- .mxs — a geocoding index for read-write datasets (ODB format) {content-type: application/vnd.shp}
- .atx — an attribute index for the .dbf file in the form of shapefile.columnname.atx (ArcGIS 8 and later) {content-type: application/vnd.shp }
- .shp.xml — geospatial metadata in XML format, such as ISO 19115 or other XML schema {content-type: application/fgdc+xml}
- .cpg — used to specify the code page (only for .dbf) for identifying the character encoding to be used {content-type: text/plain OR application/vnd.shp }
- .qix — an alternative quadtree spatial index used by MapServer and GDAL/OGR software {content-type: application/vnd.shp}

In each of the .shp, .shx, and .dbf files, the shapes in each file correspond to each other in sequence (i.e., the first record in the .shp file corresponds to the first record in the .shx and .dbf files, etc.). The .shp and .shx files have various fields with different endianness, so an implementer of the file formats must be very careful to respect the endianness of each field and treat it properly.

== File formats ==
=== Shapefile shape format (.shp) ===
The main file (.shp) contains the geometry data. Geometry of a given feature is stored as a set of vector coordinates. The binary file consists of a single fixed-length header followed by one or more variable-length records. Each of the variable-length records includes a record-header component and a record-contents component. A detailed description of the file format is given in the ESRI Shapefile Technical Description. This format should not be confused with the AutoCAD shape font source format, which shares the .shp extension.

The 2D axis ordering of coordinate data assumes a Cartesian coordinate system, using the order (X Y) or (Easting Northing). This axis order is consistent for Geographic coordinate systems, where the order is similarly (longitude latitude). Geometries may also support 3- or 4-dimensional Z and M coordinates, for elevation and measure, respectively. A Z-dimension stores the elevation of each coordinate in 3D space, which can be used for analysis or for visualisation of geometries using 3D computer graphics. The user-defined M dimension can be used for one of many functions, such as storing linear referencing measures or relative time of a feature in 4D space.

The main file header is fixed at 100 bytes in length and contains 17 fields; nine 4-byte (32-bit signed integer or int32) integer fields followed by eight 8-byte (double) signed floating point fields:

==== Shapefile headers ====
Header of a .shp file format
Bytes	Type	Endianness	Usage
0–3	int32	big	File code (always hex value 0x0000270a)
4–23	int32	big	Unused; five uint32
24–27	int32	big	File length (in 16-bit words, including the header)
28–31	int32	little	Version
32–35	int32	little	Shape type (see reference below)
36–67	double	little	Minimum bounding rectangle (MBR) of all shapes contained within the dataset; four doubles in the following order: min X, min Y, max X, max Y
68–83	double	little	Range of Z; two doubles in the following order: min Z, max Z
84–99	double	little	Range of M; two doubles in the following order: min M, max M

==== Shapefile record headers ====
The file then contains any number of variable-length records. Each record is prefixed with a record header of 8 bytes:

Bytes	Type	Endianness	Usage
0–3	int32	big	Record number (1-based)
4–7	int32	big	Record length (in 16-bit words)

==== Shapefile records ====
Following the record header is the actual record:

Bytes	Type	Endianness	Usage
0–3	int32	little	Shape type (see reference below)
4–	–	–	Shape content

The variable-length record contents depend on the shape type, which must be either the shape type given in the file header or Null. The following are the possible shape types:

Value	Shape type	Fields
0	Null shape	None
1	Point	X, Y
3	Polyline	MBR, Number of parts, Number of points, Parts, Points
5	Polygon	MBR, Number of parts, Number of points, Parts, Points
8	MultiPoint	MBR, Number of points, Points
11	PointZ	X, Y, Z Optional: M
13	PolylineZ	Mandatory: MBR, Number of parts, Number of points, Parts, Points, Z range, Z array Optional: M range, M array
15	PolygonZ	Mandatory: MBR, Number of parts, Number of points, Parts, Points, Z range, Z array Optional: M range, M array
18	MultiPointZ	Mandatory: MBR, Number of points, Points, Z range, Z array Optional: M range, M array
21	PointM	X, Y, M
23	PolylineM	Mandatory: MBR, Number of parts, Number of points, Parts, Points Optional: M range, M array
25	PolygonM	Mandatory: MBR, Number of parts, Number of points, Parts, Points Optional: M range, M array
28	MultiPointM	Mandatory: MBR, Number of points, Points Optional Fields: M range, M array
31	MultiPatch	Mandatory: MBR, Number of parts, Number of points, Parts, Part types, Points, Z range, Z array Optional: M range, M array

=== Shapefile shape index format (.shx) ===
The index contains positional index of the feature geometry and the same 100-byte header as the .shp file, followed by any number of 8-byte fixed-length records which consist of the following two fields:

Bytes	Type	Endianness	Usage
0–3	int32	big	Record offset (in 16-bit words)
4–7	int32	big	Record length (in 16-bit words)

Using this index, it is possible to seek backwards in the shapefile by, first, seeking backwards in the shape index (which is possible because it uses fixed-length records), then reading the record offset, and using that offset to seek to the correct position in the .shp file. It is also possible to seek forwards an arbitrary number of records using the same method.

It is possible to generate the complete index file given a lone .shp file. However, since a shapefile is supposed to always contain an index, doing so counts as repairing a corrupt file.

=== Shapefile attribute format (.dbf) ===
This file stores the attributes for each shape; it uses the dBase IV format. The format is public knowledge, and has been implemented in many dBase clones known as xBase. The open-source shapefile C library, for example, calls its format "xBase" even though it's plain dBase IV.

The names and values of attributes are not standardized, and will be different depending on the source of the shapefile.

=== Shapefile spatial index format (.sbn) ===
This is a binary spatial index file, which is used only by Esri software. The format is not documented by Esri. However it has been reverse-engineered and documented by the open source community. The 100-byte header is similar to the one in .shp. It is not currently implemented by other vendors. The .sbn file is not strictly necessary, since the .shp file contains all of the information necessary to successfully parse the spatial data.

== Limitations ==
The shapefile format has a number of limitations.

=== Topology and the shapefile format ===
The shapefile format does not have the ability to store topological relationships between shapes. The ESRI ArcInfo coverages and many geodatabases do have the ability to store feature topology.

=== Data storage ===
The size of both .shp and .dbf component files cannot exceed 2 GB (or 2^{31} bytes) — around 70 million point features at best. The maximum number of feature for other geometry types varies depending on the number of vertices used.

The attribute database format for the .dbf component file is based on an older dBase standard. This database format inherently has a number of limitations:

- While the current dBase standard, and GDAL/OGR (the main open source software library for reading and writing shapefile format datasets) support null values, ESRI software represents these values as zeros — a very serious issue for analyzing quantitative data, as it may skew representation and statistics if null quantities are represented as zero
- Poor support for Unicode field names or field storage
- Maximum length of field names is 10 characters
- Maximum number of fields is 255
- Supported field types are: floating point (13 character storage), integer (4 or 9 character storage), date (no time storage; 8 character storage), and text (maximum 254 character storage)
- Floating point numbers may contain rounding errors since they are stored as text

=== Mixing shape types ===
Because the shape type precedes each geometry record, a shapefile is technically capable of storing a mixture of different shape types. However, the specification states, "All the non-Null shapes in a shapefile are required to be of the same shape type." Therefore, this ability to mix shape types must be limited to interspersing null shapes with the single shape type declared in the file's header. A shapefile must not contain both polyline and polygon data, for example, the descriptions for a well (point), a river (polyline), and a lake (polygon) would be stored in three separate datasets.

== See also ==
- Geographic information system
- Open Geospatial Consortium
- Open Source Geospatial Foundation (OSGeo)
- List of geographic information systems software
- Comparison of geographic information systems software
