= Esri =

American geospatial software company

Environmental Systems Research Institute, Inc.

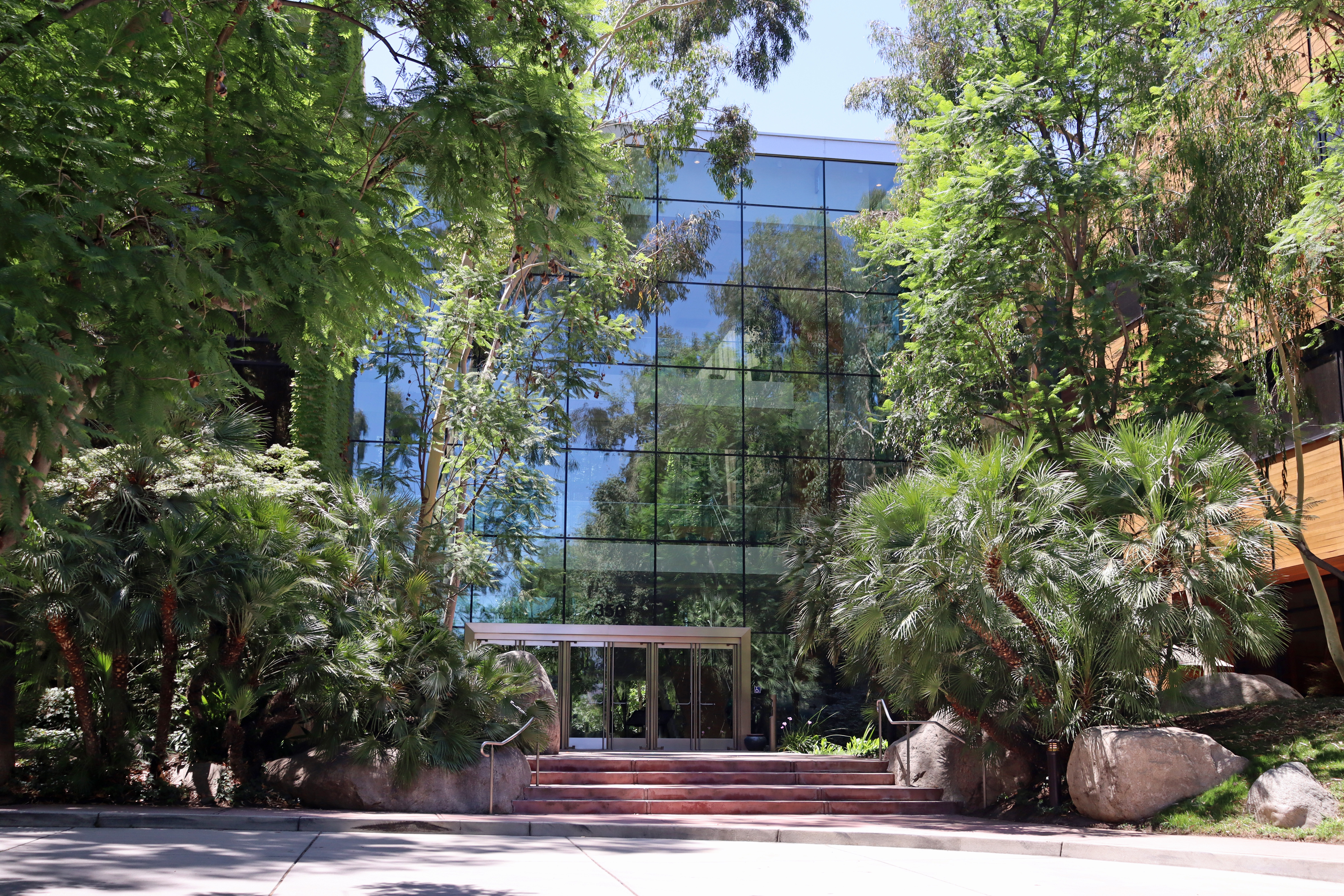
- Entrance to lobby at Esri headquarters in Redlands
- Trade name: Esri
- Type: Private
- Industry: Software
- Founded: 1969; 57 years ago in Redlands, California, U.S.
- Founders: Jack Dangermond; Laura Dangermond
- Headquarters: Redlands, California, U.S.
- Number of locations: 49
- Products: ArcGIS, ArcGIS Desktop, ArcGIS Enterprise, ArcGIS Online, ArcGIS Pro
- Revenue: $1.1 billion (2014)
- Number of employees: 3,800 (2016)
- Website: www.esri.com

Environmental Systems Research Institute, Inc., doing business as Esri (/ˈɛzriː/), is an American geographic information system (GIS) software company headquartered in Redlands, California. It is best known for its ArcGIS products. With 45% market share as of 2015, Esri is one of the world's leading suppliers of GIS software, web GIS, local intelligence, and geodatabase management applications.

The company currently has 49 offices worldwide including 11 research and development centers in the United States, Europe, the Middle East and Africa and Asia Pacific. There are 10 regional U.S. offices and over 3,000 partners globally, with users in every country and a total of over a million active users in 350,000 organizations. These include Fortune 500 companies, most national governments, 20,000 cities, all 50 US States and 7,000+ universities. The firm has 4,000 total employees, and is privately held by its founders. Strategic partners include Microsoft, Salesforce, Amazon Web Services, Autodesk, and SAP, among others. In a 2016 Investor's Business Daily article, Esri's annual revenues were indicated to be $1.1 billion.

== History ==
In 1969, Esri was founded, first, as a land use consulting firm by Jack Dangermond and Laura Dangermond with $1,100. Esri was established when the couple started working on the technology to integrate human development with environmental stewardship at Harvard University's lab for computer graphics and spatial analysis in the early 1960s. Inspired by the early mapmaking software in development at the lab, the couple conceptualized using computer-powered mapping and analysis for complex problem-solving.

Before commercial software became its principal focus, Esri operated as a consultancy organizing and analyzing geographic information for public agencies and private clients. Its early work included subcontracts for landscape architects and civil engineers, applying computerized mapping and spatial analysis to land-use suitability studies and environmental planning. These methods allowed planners to compare layers of geographic information when evaluating land for development or conservation.

In 1970, San Diego County selected Esri to develop the Polygon Information Overlay System (PIOS). The following year, the company participated in designing the Land Use Planning and Management System for the City of Los Angeles. Esri also developed the Maryland Automated Geographic Information (MAGI) System for the Maryland Department of State Planning. Implemented in 1974, MAGI was intended to assist the department in preparing its State Development Plan.

Over time, Esri began commercializing tools developed for its project work. In the 1980s, the company released Arc/Info, the first commercial GIS program, containing maps attached to relational database. In the late 1990s, Esri reengineered Arc/Info and developed it into a modular and scalable GIS platform. Esri then switched from providing contract mapping services to developing mapping software products. The first ArcGIS software offering (8.1) was announced at the Esri International User Conference (Esri UC) in 2000. ArcGIS 8.1 was officially released on April 24, 2001.

== Products ==
Esri uses the name ArcGIS to refer to its suite of GIS software products, which operate on desktop, server, and mobile platforms. ArcGIS also includes developer products and web services. In a general sense, the term GIS describes any information system that integrates, stores, edits, analyzes, shares and displays geographic information for informing decision making.

=== Desktop GIS ===
As of January 2026, the company's desktop GIS suite is ArcGIS Pro 3.6, with the older ArcGIS Desktop (or ArcMap) version 10.8.2 in mature support (to be fully retired in March 2026). The older ArcGIS Desktop consisted of several integrated applications, including ArcMap, ArcCatalog, ArcToolbox, ArcScene, and ArcGlobe. Esri's main desktop, or thick client, application is ArcGIS Pro which is slowly replacing the former main components of ArcGIS Desktop: ArcMap, ArcCatalog and ArcToolbox. Esri's desktop products allow users to author, analyze, map, manage, share, and publish geographic information.

ArcGIS Pro was introduced in early 2015 as a 64-bit application with integrated 2D and 3D functionality. The product suite is available in three levels of licensing: Basic (formerly called ArcView), Standard (formerly called ArcEditor) and Advanced (formerly called ArcInfo). Basic provides a basic set of GIS capabilities suitable for many GIS applications. Standard, at added cost, allows more extensive data editing and manipulation, including server geodatabase editing. Advanced, at the high end, provides full, advanced analysis and data management capabilities, including geostatistical and topological analysis tools. Additionally, ArcGIS is compatible with following OGC standards: WFS, WCS, GFS and various others.

ArcGIS Explorer, ArcGIS Earth, ArcReader, and ArcExplorer are basic freeware applications for viewing GIS data.

ArcGIS Desktop extensions are available, including Spatial Analyst for raster analysis, and 3D Analyst for terrain mapping and analysis. Other more specialized extensions are available from Esri and third parties.

Esri's original product, ARC/INFO, was a command line GIS product available initially on minicomputers, then on UNIX workstations. In 1992, a GUI GIS, ArcView GIS, was introduced. Over time, both products were offered in Windows versions, and ArcView also as a Macintosh product. The names ArcView and ArcInfo were used for a while to name different levels of licensing in ArcGIS Desktop, and less often refer to these original software products. The Windows version of ArcGIS is now the only ArcGIS Desktop platform that is undergoing new development for future product releases.

=== Server GIS ===
Server GIS products provide GIS functionality and data deployed from a central environment. ArcGIS Server is an Internet application service, used to extend the functionality of ArcGIS Desktop software to a browser based environment. It is available on Solaris and Linux as well as Windows. ArcSDE (Spatial Database Engine) is used as a relational database connector for other Esri software to store and retrieve GIS data within a commercially available database: currently, it can be used with Oracle, PostgreSQL, DB2, Informix and Microsoft SQL Server databases. It supports its native SDE binary data format, Oracle Spatial, and ST_geometry. ArcIMS (Internet Mapping Server) provides browser-based access to GIS. As of ArcGIS 10.1, ArcIMS has been deprecated in favor of ArcGIS Server, but there are still many instances of ArcIMS (10.0 and older) in production environments. Other server-based products include Geoportal Server, ArcGIS Image Server, and Tracking Server.

=== Mobile GIS ===
Mobile GIS conflates GIS, GPS, location-based services, hand-held computing, and the growing availability of geographic data. ArcGIS technology can be deployed on a range of mobile systems from lightweight devices to PDAs, laptops, and Tablet PCs. The firm's products for this use include ArcGIS Field Maps, Survey123 for ArcGIS, and ArcGIS QuickCapture. Former products and applications in this category included ArcPad, Collector for ArcGIS, and ArcGIS for Mobile.

=== Online GIS ===
==== ArcGIS Online ====
ArcGIS Online is a cloud-based mapping and analysis platform produced by Esri, utilizing a software-as-a-service (SaaS) model. Users have the capability to make maps, analyze data, and share their work. This platform can display both 2D and 3D data, and allows users to collaborate with other users to produce various GIS products. Unlike ArcGIS Server and Portal, ArcGIS Online is completely managed by Esri and is accessed utilizing a wide range of access options.

Features included in ArcGIS Online include:

- 2D and 3D map creation
- Data visualization in multiple formats
- Integration with other authoritative data sources such as IoT and sensor feeds
- Robust and native data analysis
- Automation using both python notebooks and no-code options

Core applications included with ArcGIS Online:

- ArcGIS Pro
- ArcGIS Dashboards
- ArcGIS Field Maps
- ArcGIS Experience Builder
- Scene Viewer

==== ArcGIS Portal ====
ArcGIS Portal, also known as Portal for ArcGIS, is a web-based component of ArcGIS Enterprise developed by Esri. It provides an organizational platform for managing, discovering, creating, and sharing geospatial information, including maps, scenes, layers, applications, and other geographic data. Portal provides a central website through which users can access GIS content and collaborate with other members of an organization.

Portal supports the creation and sharing of web maps and 3D scenes, development of web mapping applications, and organization of content through groups and user accounts. Administrators can configure the portal's appearance, security, user roles, and access permissions. Portal can also be integrated with ArcGIS Server and other ArcGIS Enterprise components to provide access to GIS services and data.

Unlike ArcGIS Online, which is hosted by Esri, Portal for ArcGIS is part of the self-hosted ArcGIS Enterprise platform and can be deployed on an organization's own infrastructure or supported cloud environments. This allows organizations to maintain greater control over the storage, security, and administration of their GIS resources.

== Data formats ==
=== Vector ===
- Shapefile – Esri's proprietary, hybrid vector data format using SHP, SHX and DBF files. Originally invented in the early 1990s, it is still commonly used as a widely supported spatial data interchange format.
- Enterprise Geodatabase – Esri's geodatabase format for use in an relational database system.
- File Geodatabase – Esri's file-based geodatabase format, stored as folders in a file system.
- Personal Geodatabase – Esri's closed, integrated vector data storage strategy using Microsoft's Access MDB format is a legacy format generally replaced by the file geodatabase in most contemporary use.With the retirement of the ArcMap application, personal geodatabases are being phased out and are not compatible with the newer software, ArcGIS Pro.
- Coverage – Esri's closed, hybrid vector data storage strategy. Legacy ArcGIS Workstation / ArcInfo format with reduced support in modern application.

=== Raster ===
- Esri grid – binary and metadataless ASCII raster formats.
- Mosaic - data structure for managing and analyzing multidimensional raster and imagery data, including netCDF, GRIB, and Hierarchical Data Format

== Esri Technical Certification ==
The Esri Technical Certification program was launched in January 2011. The program provides an exam based certification for Esri software. The core groups for the certification include Desktop, Developer, and Enterprise.

== Conference ==
The company hosts the Esri International User Conference, which was first held on the Redlands campus in 1981 with 16 attendees. The 44th User Conference was held in San Diego at the San Diego Convention Center from July 15 to 19, 2024. In 2022, 31,590 users from 142 countries attended either in person or digitally.

== Philanthropy ==
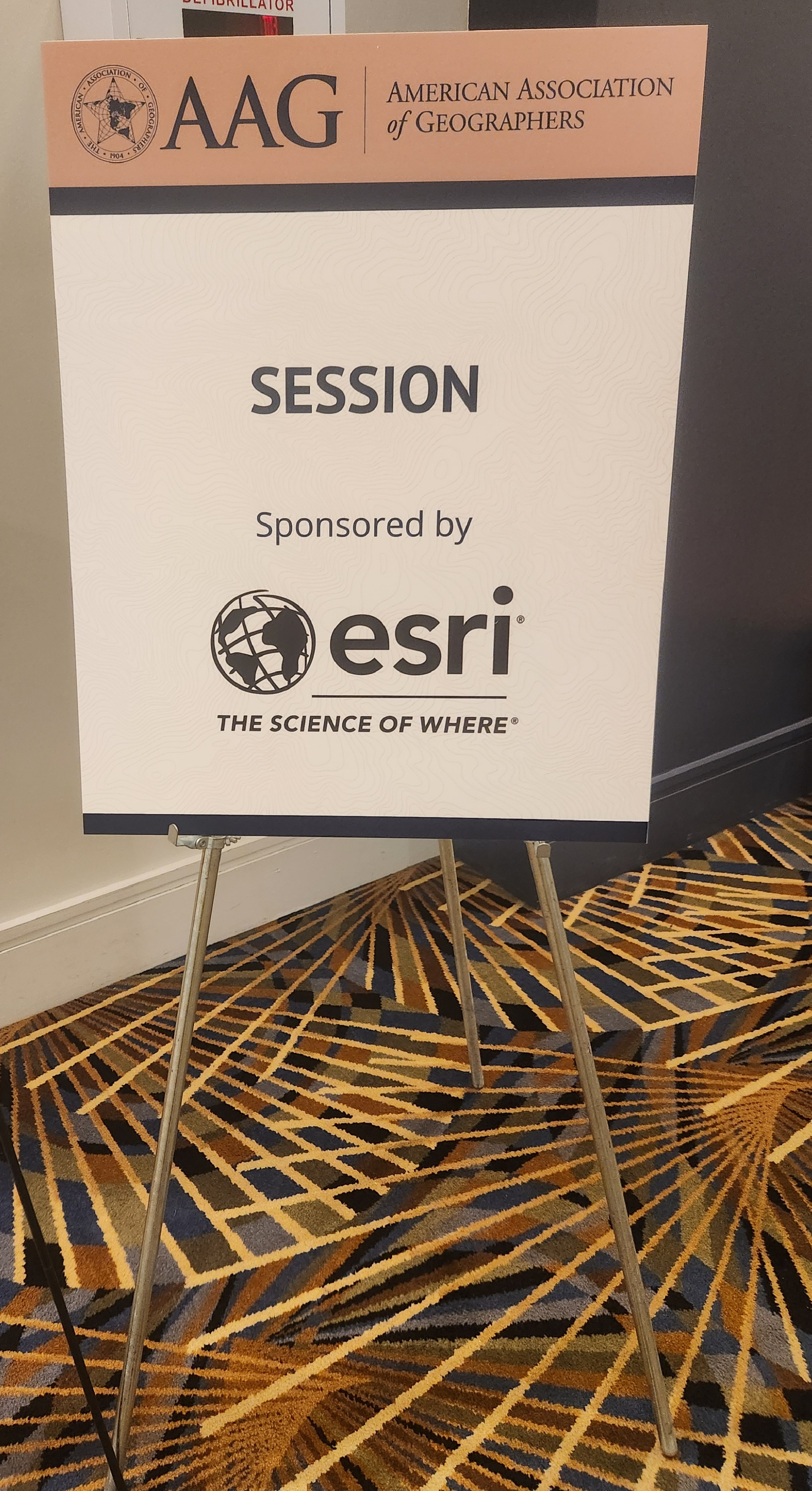
Sign at the 2025 AAG conference indicating the session was sponsored by ESRI

Esri provides low-cost access to ArcGIS software via special programs. The company has provided free access to ArcGIS Online to over 100,000 K-12 schools in the U.S. as part of Barack Obama's ConnectED initiative. Esri sponsors the Esri Young Professionals Network, which seeks to help GIS professionals after graduation in their careers.

Since 1994, Esri's Disaster Response program has supported response and recovery for crises including the Northridge earthquake, the Exxon Valdez oil spill, 9/11, the space shuttle Columbia crash, COVID-19, the Baltimore bridge collapse, and New Mexico's fires and floods.

Esri is involved with the American Association of Geographers and hosts workshops and educational sessions. They sponsored the student center at the 2025 national conference.

== Conservation and sustainability ==
In 1989, Esri created the Esri Conservation Program to assist in changing the operations of non-profit organizations for their objectives of nature conservation and social change. Esri's ArcGIS platform has provided GIS data, analytics software, and training to thousands of non-profit organizations and individual conservation projects since 1993.

In 2017, Esri began a partnership with the United Nations General Assembly (UNGA) to create a data hub, Federated Systems, based on Esri's ArcGIS platform. The data hub will allow countries to measure, monitor, and report on Sustainable Development Goals (SDGs) in a geographic context.

In 2019, Esri partnered with the Jane Goodall Institute to develop tools to help communities map and manage their surrounding ecosystems using GIS software. In 2022, they partnered again to publish a book “Local Voices, Local Choices,” to describe the success of the Tacare approach to community-led conservation.

== See also ==
- Open Geospatial Consortium
- QGIS
- Smart Data Compression
