= List of ISO standards 18000–19999 =

This is a list of published (Note: This list generally excludes draft versions.) International Organization for Standardization (ISO) standards and other deliverables. (Note: ISO deliverables include "specifications" (ISO/PAS, ISO/TS), "reports" (ISO/TR), etc, which are not referred to by ISO as "standards".) For a complete and up-to-date list of all the ISO standards, see the ISO catalogue.

The standards are protected by copyright and most of them must be purchased. However, about 300 of the standards produced by ISO and IEC's Joint Technical Committee 1 (JTC 1) have been made freely and publicly available.

== ISO 18000 – ISO 18999 ==
=== ISO 18000 – ISO 18099 ===
- ISO/IEC 18000 Information technology – Radio frequency identification for item management
- ISO/IEC 18004:2015 Information technology – Automatic identification and data capture techniques – QR Code bar code symbology specification
- ISO/IEC 18009:1999 Information technology – Programming languages – Ada: Conformity assessment of a language processor
- ISO/IEC 18010:2002 Information technology - Pathways and spaces for customer premises cabling
- ISO/IEC 18012 Information technology - Home Electronic System - Guidelines for product interoperability
  - ISO/IEC 18012-1:2004 Part 1: Introduction
  - ISO/IEC 18012-2:2012 Part 2: Taxonomy and application interoperability model
- ISO/IEC 18013 Information technology – Personal identification – ISO-compliant driving license
  - ISO/IEC 18013-1:2005 Part 1: Physical characteristics and basic data set
  - ISO/IEC 18013-2:2008 Part 2: Machine-readable technologies
  - ISO/IEC 18013-3:2017 Part 3: Access control, authentication and integrity validation
  - ISO/IEC 18013-4:2019 Part 4: Test methods
  - ISO/IEC 18013-5 Part 5: Mobile driving licence (mDL) application
- ISO/IEC 18014 Information technology – Security techniques – Time-stamping services
- ISO/IEC TR 18015:2006 Information technology - Programming languages, their environments and system software interfaces - Technical Report on C++ Performance
- ISO/IEC TR 18016:2003 Information technology – Message Handling Systems (MHS): Interworking with Internet e-mail
- ISO/IEC 18017:2001 Information technology – Telecommunications and information exchange between systems – Private Integrated Services Network – Mapping functions for the employment of Virtual Private Network scenarios
- ISO/IEC TR 18018:2010 Information technology - Systems and software engineering - Guide for configuration management tool capabilities
- ISO/IEC 18021:2002 Information technology – User interfaces for mobile tools for management of database communications in a client-server model
- ISO/IEC 18023 Information technology – SEDRIS
  - ISO/IEC 18023-1:2006 Part 1: Functional specification
  - ISO/IEC 18023-2:2006 Part 2: Abstract transmittal format
  - ISO/IEC 18023-3:2006 Part 3: Transmittal format binary encoding
- ISO/IEC 18024 Information technology – SEDRIS language bindings
  - ISO/IEC 18024-4:2006 Part 4: C
- ISO/IEC 18025:2005 Information technology – Environmental Data Coding Specification (EDCS)
- ISO/IEC 18026:2009 Information technology – Spatial Reference Model (SRM)
- ISO/IEC 18031:2011 Information technology - Security techniques - Random bit generation
- ISO/IEC 18032:2005 Information technology - Security techniques - Prime number generation
- ISO/IEC 18033 Information technology – Security techniques – Encryption algorithms
  - ISO/IEC 18033-1:2015 Part 1: General
  - ISO/IEC 18033-2:2006 Part 2: Asymmetric ciphers
  - ISO/IEC 18033-3:2010 Part 3: Block ciphers
  - ISO/IEC 18033-4:2011 Part 4: Stream ciphers
  - ISO/IEC 18033-5:2015 Part 5: Identity-based ciphers
- ISO/IEC 18035:2003 Information technology – Icon symbols and functions for controlling multimedia software applications
- ISO/IEC 18036:2003 Information technology - Icon symbols and functions for World Wide Web browser toolbars
- ISO/IEC TR 18037:2008 Programming languages - C - Extensions to support embedded processors
- ISO/IEC 18041 Information technology – Computer graphics, image processing and environmental data representation – Environmental Data Coding Specification (EDCS) language bindings
  - ISO/IEC 18041-4:2016 Part 4: C
- ISO/IEC 18042 Information technology – Computer graphics and image processing – Spatial Reference Model (SRM) language bindings
  - ISO/IEC 18042-4:2006 Part 4: C
- ISO/IEC 18045:2008 Information technology - Security techniques - Methodology for IT security evaluation
- ISO/IEC 18046 Information technology - Radio frequency identification device performance test methods
  - ISO/IEC 18046-1:2011 Part 1: Test methods for system performance
  - ISO/IEC 18046-2:2011 Part 2: Test methods for interrogator performance
  - ISO/IEC 18046-3:2012 Part 3: Test methods for tag performance
  - ISO/IEC 18046-4:2015 Part 4: Test methods for performance of RFID gates in libraries
- ISO/IEC 18047 Information technology - Radio frequency identification device conformance test methods
  - ISO/IEC 18047-2:2012 Part 2: Test methods for air interface communications below 135 kHz
  - ISO/IEC TR 18047-3:2011 Part 3: Test methods for air interface communications at 13,56 MHz
  - ISO/IEC TR 18047-4:2004 Part 4: Test methods for air interface communications at 2,45 GHz
  - ISO/IEC 18047-6:2012 Part 6: Test methods for air interface communications at 860 MHz to 960 MHz
  - ISO/IEC TR 18047-7:2010 Part 7: Test methods for active air interface communications at 433 MHz
- ISO/IEC 18050:2006 Information technology - Office equipment - Print quality attributes for machine readable Digital Postage Marks
- ISO/IEC 18051:2012 Information technology – Telecommunications and information exchange between systems – Services for Computer Supported Telecommunications Applications (CSTA) Phase III
- ISO/IEC 18052:2012 Information technology – Telecommunications and information exchange between systems – ASN.1 for Computer Supported Telecommunications Applications (CSTA) Phase III
- ISO/IEC TR 18053:2000 Information technology - Telecommunications and information exchange between systems - Glossary of definitions and terminology for Computer Supported Telecommunications Applications (CSTA) Phase III
- ISO/IEC 18056:2012 Information technology – Telecommunications and information exchange between systems – XML Schema Definitions for Computer Supported Telecommunications Applications (CSTA) Phase III
- ISO/IEC TR 18057:2004 Information technology – Telecommunications and information exchange between systems – Using ECMA-323 (CSTA XML) in a Voice Browser Environment
- ISO/TS 18062:2016 Health informatics – Categorial structure for representation of herbal medicaments in terminological systems
- ISO 18064:2014 Thermoplastic elastomers – Nomenclature and abbreviated terms
- ISO 18065:2015 Tourism and related services – Tourist services for public use provided by Natural Protected Areas Authorities – Requirements
- ISO 18082:2014 Anaesthetic and respiratory equipment – Dimensions of non-interchangeable screw-threaded (NIST) low-pressure connectors for medical gases
- ISO 18091:2014 Quality management systems – Guidelines for the application of ISO 9001:2008 in local government
- ISO/IEC 18092:2013 Information technology – Telecommunications and information exchange between systems – Near Field Communication – Interface and Protocol (NFCIP-1)
- ISO/IEC 18093:1999 Information technology - Data interchange on 130 mm optical disk cartridges of type WORM (Write Once Read Many) using irreversible effects - Capacity: 5,2 Gbytes per cartridge

=== ISO 18100 – ISO 18199 ===
- ISO 18104:2014 Health informatics – Categorial structures for representation of nursing diagnoses and nursing actions in terminological systems
- ISO/TS 18110:2015 Nanotechnologies - Vocabularies for science, technology and innovation indicators
- ISO 18115 Surface chemical analysis – Vocabulary
  - ISO 18115-1:2013 Part 1: General terms and terms used in spectroscopy
  - ISO 18115-2:2013 Part 2: Terms used in scanning-probe microscopy
- ISO 18117:2009 Surface chemical analysis – Handling of specimens prior to analysis
- ISO 18118:2004 Surface chemical analysis - Auger electron spectroscopy and X-ray photoelectron spectroscopy - Guide to the use of experimentally determined relative sensitivity factors for the quantitative analysis of homogeneous materials
- ISO/IEC TR 18120:2016 Information technology - Learning, education, and training - Requirements for e-textbooks in education
- ISO/IEC TR 18121:2015 Information technology - Learning, education and training - Virtual experiment framework
- ISO/TR 18128:2014 Information and documentation - Risk assessment for records processes and systems
- ISO 18129:2015 Condition monitoring and diagnostics of machines – Approaches for performance diagnosis
- ISO/TS 18152 Ergonomics of human-system interaction – Specification for the process assessment of human-system issues
- ISO 18158:2016 Workplace air - Terminology
- ISO/TS 18173:2005 Non-destructive testing - General terms and definitions
- ISO/IEC 18180:2013 Information technology - Specification for the Extensible Configuration Checklist Description Format (XCCDF) Version 1.2
- ISO/IEC 18181 Information technology — JPEG XL image coding system
  - ISO/IEC 18181-1:2022 Part 1: Core coding system
  - ISO/IEC 18181-2:2021 Part 2: File format
- ISO 18185 Freight containers – Electronic seals
- ISO 18189:2016 Ophthalmic optics – Contact lenses and contact lens care products – Cytotoxicity testing of contact lenses in combination with lens care solution to evaluate lens/solution interactions
- ISO 18190:2016 Anaesthetic and respiratory equipment – General requirements for airways and related equipment
- ISO 18192 Implants for surgery – Wear of total intervertebral spinal disc prostheses
  - ISO 18192-1:2011 Part 1: Loading and displacement parameters for wear testing and corresponding environmental conditions for test
  - ISO 18192-2:2010 Part 2: Nucleus replacements
  - ISO 18192-3:2017 Part 3: Impingement-wear testing and corresponding environmental conditions for test of lumbar prostheses under adverse kinematic conditions
- ISO/TR 18196:2016 Nanotechnologies – Measurement technique matrix for the characterization of nano-objects

=== ISO 18200 – ISO 18299 ===
- ISO 18215:2015 Ships and marine technology - Vessel machinery operations in polar waters - Guidelines
- ISO 18232:2006 Health Informatics – Messages and communication – Format of length limited globally unique string identifiers
- ISO/TS 18234 Intelligent transport systems – Traffic and travel information via transport protocol experts group, generation 1 (TPEG1) binary data format
  - ISO/TS 18234-1:2013 Part 1: Introduction, numbering and versions (TPEG1-INV)
  - ISO/TS 18234-2:2013 Part 2: Syntax, semantics and framing structure (TPEG1-SSF)
  - ISO/TS 18234-3:2013 Part 3: Service and network information (TPEG1-SNI)
  - ISO/TS 18234-4:2006 Part 4: Road Traffic Message (RTM) application
  - ISO/TS 18234-5:2006 Part 5: Public Transport Information (PTI) application
  - ISO/TS 18234-6:2006 Part 6: Location referencing applications
  - ISO/TS 18234-7:2013 Part 7: Parking information (TPEG1-PKI)
  - ISO/TS 18234-8:2012 Part 8: Congestion and Travel Time application (TPEG1-CTT)
  - ISO/TS 18234-9:2013 Part 9: Traffic event compact (TPEG1-TEC)
  - ISO/TS 18234-10:2013 Part 10: Conditional access information (TPEG1-CAI)
  - ISO/TS 18234-11:2013 Part 11: Location Referencing Container (TPEG1-LRC)
- ISO 18241:2016 Cardiovascular implants and extracorporeal systems – Cardiopulmonary bypass systems – Venous bubble traps
- ISO 18242:2016 Cardiovascular implants and extracorporeal systems – Centrifugal blood pumps
- ISO 18245:2003 Retail financial services – Merchant category codes
- ISO 18246:2023 Electrically propelled mopeds and motorcycles — Safety requirements for conductive connection to an external electric power supply
- ISO 18259:2014 Ophthalmic optics – Contact lens care products – Method to assess contact lens care products with contact lenses in a lens case, challenged with bacterial and fungal organisms
- ISO/IEC TR 18268:2013 Identification cards – Contactless integrated circuit cards – Proximity cards – Multiple PICCs in a single PCD field
- ISO 18295 Customer contact centres
  - ISO 18295-1:2017 Part 1: Requirements for customer contact centres
  - ISO 18295-2:2017 Part 2: Requirements for clients using the services of customer contact centres

=== ISO 18300 – ISO 18399 ===
- ISO/IEC 18305:2016 Information technology - Real time locating systems - Test and evaluation of localization and tracking systems
- ISO/TR 18307:2001 Health informatics – Interoperability and compatibility in messaging and communication standards – Key characteristics
- ISO 18308:2011 Health informatics – Requirements for an electronic health record architecture
- ISO 18312 Mechanical vibration and shock – Measurement of vibration power flow from machines into connected support structures
  - ISO 18312-1:2012 Part 1: Direct method
  - ISO 18312-2:2012 Part 2: Indirect method
- ISO/TR 18317:2017 Intelligent transport systems – Pre-emption of ITS communication networks for disaster and emergency communication – Use case scenarios
- ISO 18322:2017 Space systems – General management requirements for space test centres
- ISO/IEC 18328 Identification cards – ICC-managed devices
  - ISO/IEC 18328-1:2015 Part 1: General framework
  - ISO/IEC 18328-2:2015 Part 2: Physical characteristics and test methods for cards with devices
  - ISO/IEC 18328-3:2016 Part 3: Organization, security and commands for interchange
- ISO/TS 18339:2015 Endotherapy devices – Eyepiece cap and light guide connector
- ISO/TS 18340:2015 Endoscopes – Trocar pins, trocar sleeves and endotherapy devices for use with trocar sleeves
- ISO/TS 18344:2016 Effectiveness of paper deacidification processes
- ISO 18365:2013 Hydrometry – Selection, establishment and operation of a gauging station
- ISO/IEC 18367:2016 Information technology - Security techniques - Cryptographic algorithms and security mechanisms conformance testing
- ISO 18369 Ophthalmic optics - Contact lenses
  - ISO 18369-1:2017 Part 1: Vocabulary, classification system and recommendations for labelling specifications
  - ISO 18369-2:2017 Part 2: Tolerances
  - ISO 18369-3:2017 Part 3: Measurement methods
  - ISO 18369-4:2017 Part 4: Physicochemical properties of contact lens materials
- ISO/IEC 18370 Information technology - Security techniques - Blind digital signatures
  - ISO/IEC 18370-1:2016 Part 1: General
  - ISO/IEC 18370-2:2016 Part 2: Discrete logarithm based mechanisms
- ISO/IEC 18372:2004 Information technology – RapidIO interconnect specification
- ISO/TR 18476:2017 Ophthalmic optics and instruments – Free form technology – Spectacle lenses and measurement
- ISO/IEC 18384 Information technology - Reference Architecture for Service Oriented Architecture (SOA RA)
  - ISO/IEC 18384-1:2016 Part 1: Terminology and concepts for SOA
  - ISO/IEC 18384-2:2016 Part 2: Reference Architecture for SOA Solutions
  - ISO/IEC 18384-3:2016 Part 3: Service Oriented Architecture ontology
- ISO 18385:2016 Minimizing the risk of human DNA contamination in products used to collect, store and analyze biological material for forensic purposes – Requirements
- ISO 18388:2016 Technical product documentation (TPD) – Relief grooves – Types and dimensioning
- ISO 18391:2016 Geometrical product specifications (GPS) - Population specification

=== ISO 18400 – ISO 18499 ===
- ISO/TR 18401:2017 Nanotechnologies - Plain language explanation of selected terms from the ISO/IEC 80004 series
- ISO 18404:2015 Quantitative methods in process improvement - Six Sigma - Competencies for key personnel and their organizations in relation to Six Sigma and Lean implementation
- ISO 18405:2017 Underwater acoustics - Terminology
- ISO 18406:2017 Underwater acoustics – Measurement of radiated underwater sound from percussive pile driving
- ISO 18414:2006 Acceptance sampling procedures by attributes - Accept-zero sampling system based on credit principle for controlling outgoing quality
- ISO 18415:2017 Cosmetics – Microbiology – Detection of specified and non-specified microorganisms
- ISO 18416:2015 Cosmetics – Microbiology – Detection of Candida albicans
- ISO 18431 Mechanical vibration and shock – Signal processing
  - ISO 18431-1:2005 Part 1: General introduction
  - ISO 18431-2:2004 Part 2: Time domain windows for Fourier Transform analysis
  - ISO 18431-3:2014 Part 3: Methods of time-frequency analysis
  - ISO 18431-4:2007 Part 4: Shock-response spectrum analysis
- ISO 18434 Condition monitoring and diagnostics of machines – Thermography
  - ISO 18434-1:2008 Part 1: General procedures
- ISO 18436 Condition monitoring and diagnostics of machines – Requirements for qualification and assessment of personnel
  - ISO 18436-1:2012 Part 1: Requirements for assessment bodies and the assessment process
  - ISO 18436-2:2014 Part 2: Vibration condition monitoring and diagnostics
  - ISO 18436-3:2012 Part 3: Requirements for training bodies and the training process
  - ISO 18436-4:2014 Part 4: Field lubricant analysis
  - ISO 18436-5:2012 Part 5: Lubricant laboratory technician/analyst
  - ISO 18436-6:2014 Part 6: Acoustic emission
  - ISO 18436-7:2014 Part 7: Thermography
  - ISO 18436-8:2013 Part 8: Ultrasound
- ISO 18437 Mechanical vibration and shock – Characterization of the dynamic mechanical properties of visco-elastic materials
  - ISO 18437-1:2012 Part 1: Principles and guidelines
  - ISO 18437-2:2005 Part 2: Resonance method
  - ISO 18437-3:2005 Part 3: Cantilever shear beam method
  - ISO 18437-4:2008 Part 4: Dynamic stiffness method
  - ISO 18437-5:2011 Part 5: Poisson ratio based on comparison between measurements and finite element analysis
- ISO/IEC 18450:2013 Information technology - Telecommunications and information exchange between systems - Web Services Description Language (WSDL) for CSTA Phase III
- ISO 18451 Pigments, dyestuffs and extenders – Terminology
  - ISO 18451-1:2015 Part 1: General terms
- ISO 18457:2016 Biomimetics – Biomimetic materials, structures and components
- ISO 18458:2015 Biomimetics – Terminology, concepts and methodology
- ISO 18459:2015 Biomimetics – Biomimetic structural optimization
- ISO 18461:2016 International museum statistics
- ISO 18465:2017 Microbiology of the food chain - Quantitative determination of emetic toxin (cereulide) using LC-MS/MS
- ISO/IEC 18477 Information technology - Scalable compression and coding of continuous-tone still images
  - ISO/IEC 18477-1:2015 Part 1: Scalable compression and coding of continuous-tone still images
  - ISO/IEC 18477-2:2016 Part 2: Coding of high dynamic range images
  - ISO/IEC 18477-3:2015 Part 3: Box file format
  - ISO/IEC 18477-6:2016 Part 6: IDR Integer Coding
  - ISO/IEC 18477-7:2017 Part 7: HDR Floating-Point Coding
  - ISO/IEC 18477-8:2016 Part 8: Lossless and near-lossless coding
  - ISO/IEC 18477-9:2016 Part 9: Alpha channel coding
- ISO 18490:2015 Non-destructive testing – Evaluation of vision acuity of NDT personnel
- ISO 18495 Intelligent transport systems – Commercial freight – Automotive visibility in the distribution supply chain
  - ISO 18495-1:2016 Part 1: Architecture and data definitions

=== ISO 18500 – ISO 18599 ===
- ISO/IEC TS 18508:2015 Information technology - Additional Parallel Features in Fortran
- ISO 18513:2003 Tourism services - Hotels and other types of tourism accommodation - Terminology
- ISO/TR 18529:2000 Ergonomics – Ergonomics of human-system interaction – Human-centred lifecycle process descriptions
- ISO/TS 18530:2014 Health Informatics – Automatic identification and data capture marking and labelling – Subject of care and individual provider identification
- ISO/TR 18532:2009 Guidance on the application of statistical methods to quality and to industrial standardization
- ISO 18541 Road vehicles – Standardized access to automotive repair and maintenance information (RMI)
- ISO 18542 Road vehicles – Standardized repair and maintenance information (RMI) terminology
  - ISO 18542-1:2012 Part 1: General information and use case definition
  - ISO 18542-2:2014 Part 2: Standardized process implementation requirements, Registration Authority
- ISO 18562 Biocompatibility evaluation of breathing gas pathways in healthcare applications
  - ISO 18562-1:2017 Part 1: Evaluation and testing within a risk management process
  - ISO 18562-2:2017 Part 2: Tests for emissions of particulate matter
  - ISO 18562-3:2017 Part 3: Tests for emissions of volatile organic compounds (VOCs)
  - ISO 18562-4:2017 Part 4: Tests for leachables in condensate
- ISO 18564:2016 Machinery for forestry – Noise test code
- ISO/IEC 18584:2015 Information technology – Identification cards – Conformance test requirements for on-card biometric comparison applications
- ISO 18587:2017 Translation services - Post-editing of machine translation output - Requirements
- ISO 18589 Measurement of radioactivity in the environment - Soil
  - ISO 18589-1:2005 Part 1: General guidelines and definitions
  - ISO 18589-2:2015 Part 2: Guidance for the selection of the sampling strategy, sampling and pre-treatment of samples
  - ISO 18589-3:2015 Part 3: Test method of gamma-emitting radionuclides using gamma-ray spectrometry
  - ISO 18589-4:2009 Part 4: Measurement of plutonium isotopes (plutonium 238 and plutonium 239 + 240) by alpha spectrometry
  - ISO 18589-5:2009 Part 5: Measurement of strontium 90
  - ISO 18589-6:2009 Part 6: Measurement of gross alpha and gross beta activities
  - ISO 18589-7:2013 Part 7: In situ measurement of gamma-emitting radionuclides
- ISO 18593:2004 Microbiology of food and animal feeding stuffs – Horizontal methods for sampling techniques from surfaces using contact plates and swabs
- ISO/IEC 18598:2016 Information technology - Automated infrastructure management (AIM) systems - Requirements, data exchange and applications

=== ISO 18600 – ISO 18699 ===
- ISO 18600:2015 Textile machinery and accessories – Web roller cards – Terms and definitions
- ISO 18601:2013 Packaging and the environment - General requirements for the use of ISO standards in the field of packaging and the environment
- ISO 18602:2013 Packaging and the environment—Optimization of the packaging system
- ISO 18603:2013 Packaging and the environment—Reuse
- ISO 18604:2013 Packaging and the environment—Material recycling
- ISO 18605:2013 Packaging and the environment—Energy recovery
- ISO 18606:2013 Packaging and the environment—Organic recycling
- ISO/TS 18614:2016 Packaging - Label material - Required information for ordering and specifying self-adhesive labels
- ISO 18619:2015 Image technology colour management - Black point compensation
- ISO 18626:2017 Information and documentation - Interlibrary Loan Transactions
- ISO 18629 Industrial automation systems and integration – Process specification language
- ISO/TR 18637:2016 Nanotechnologies – Overview of available frameworks for the development of occupational exposure limits and bands for nano-objects and their aggregates and agglomerates (NOAAs)
- ISO/TR 18638:2017 Health informatics – Guidance on health information privacy education in healthcare organizations
- ISO 18649:2004 Mechanical vibration – Evaluation of measurement results from dynamic tests and investigations on bridges
- ISO 18650 Building construction machinery and equipment – Concrete mixers
  - ISO 18650-1:2004 Part 1: Vocabulary and general specifications
- ISO/IEC TS 18661 Information technology - Programming languages, their environments, and system software interfaces - Floating-point extensions for C
  - ISO/IEC TS 18661-1:2014 Part 1: Binary floating-point arithmetic
  - ISO/IEC TS 18661-2:2015 Part 2: Decimal floating-point arithmetic
  - ISO/IEC TS 18661-3:2015 Part 3: Interchange and extended types
  - ISO/IEC TS 18661-4:2015 Part 4: Supplementary functions
  - ISO/IEC TS 18661-5:2016 Part 5: Supplementary attributes
- ISO 18662 Traditional Chinese medicine - Vocabulary
  - ISO 18662-1:2017 Part 1: Chinese Materia Medica
- ISO 18665:2015 Traditional Chinese medicine – Herbal decoction apparatus
- ISO 18666:2015 Traditional Chinese medicine – General requirements of moxibustion devices
- ISO/IEC 18670:2025 Information technology — SoftWare Hash IDentifier (SWHID) Specification V1.2
- ISO 18682:2016 Intelligent transport systems – External hazard detection and notification systems – Basic requirements

=== ISO 18700 – ISO 18799 ===
- ISO 18739:2016 Dentistry - Vocabulary of process chain for CAD/CAM systems
- ISO 18743:2015 Microbiology of the food chain – Detection of Trichinella larvae in meat by artificial digestion method
- ISO 18744:2016 Microbiology of the food chain – Detection and enumeration of Cryptosporidium and Giardia in fresh leafy green vegetables and berry fruits
- ISO/IEC 18745 Information technology – Test methods for machine readable travel documents (MRTD) and associated devices
  - ISO/IEC 18745-1:2014 Part 1: Physical test methods for passport books (durability)
  - ISO/IEC 18745-2:2016 Part 2: Test methods for the contactless interface
- ISO 18746:2016 Traditional Chinese medicine – Sterile intradermal acupuncture needles for single use
- ISO/TS 18750:2015 Intelligent transport systems – Cooperative systems – Definition of a global concept for Local Dynamic Maps
- ISO/PAS 18761:2013 Use and handling of medical devices covered by the scope of ISO/TC 84 – Risk assessment on mucocutaneous blood exposure
- ISO 18774:2015 Securities and related financial instruments – Financial Instrument Short Name (FISN)
- ISO 18775:2008 Veneers – Terms and definitions, determination of physical characteristics and tolerances
- ISO 18777:2005 Transportable liquid oxygen systems for medical use – Particular requirements
- ISO 18778:2005 Respiratory equipment – Infant monitors – Particular requirements
- ISO 18788:2015 Management system for private security operations – Requirements with guidance for use
- ISO/TS 18790 Health informatics – Profiling framework and classification for Traditional Medicine informatics standards development
  - ISO/TS 18790-1:2015 Part 1: Traditional Chinese Medicine

=== ISO 18800 – ISO 18899 ===
- ISO/IEC 18809:2000 Information technology – 8 mm wide magnetic tape cartridge for information interchange – Helical scan recording AIT-1 with MIC format
- ISO/IEC 18810:2001 Information technology – 8 mm wide magnetic tape cartridge for information interchange – Helical scan recording AIT-2 with MIC format
- ISO 18812:2003 Health informatics – Clinical analyser interfaces to laboratory information systems – Use profiles
- ISO/IEC TS 18822:2015 Programming languages - C++ - File System Technical Specification
- ISO/TS 18827:2017 Nanotechnologies – Electron spin resonance (ESR) as a method for measuring reactive oxygen species (ROS) generated by metal oxide nanomaterials
- ISO 18829:2017 Document management - Assessing ECM/EDRM implementations - Trustworthiness
- ISO 18831:2016 Clothing – Digital fittings – Attributes of virtual garments
- ISO 18835:2015 Inhalational anaesthesia systems – Draw-over anaesthetic systems
- ISO/IEC 18836:2001 Information technology – 8 mm wide magnetic tape cartridge for information interchange – Helical scan recording – MammothTape-2 format
- ISO 18841:2018 Interpreting services — General requirements and recommendations
- ISO/TR 18845:2017 Dentistry - Test methods for machining accuracy of computer-aided milling machines
- ISO/TS 18867:2015 Microbiology of the food chain – Polymerase chain reaction (PCR) for the detection of food-borne pathogens – Detection of pathogenic Yersinia enterocolitica and Yersinia pseudotuberculosis
- ISO 18875:2015 Coalbed methane exploration and development – Terms and definitions
- ISO/TS 18876 Industrial automation systems and integration - Integration of industrial data for exchange, access and sharing
  - ISO/TS 18876-1:2003 Part 1: Architecture overview and description
  - ISO/TS 18876-2:2003 Part 2: Integration and mapping methodology
- ISO 18878:2013 Mobile elevating work platforms – Operator (driver) training
- ISO/IEC/IEEE 18880:2015 Information technology – Ubiquitous green community control network protocol
- ISO/IEC/IEEE 18881:2016 Information technology – Ubiquitous green community control network – Control and management
- ISO/IEC/IEEE 18882:2017 Information technology – Telecommunications and information exchange between systems – Ubiquitous green community control network: Heterogeneous networks convergence and scalability
- ISO/IEC/IEEE 18883:2016 Information technology – Ubiquitous green community control network – Security

=== ISO 18900 – ISO 18999 ===
- ISO 18913:2012 Imaging materials - Permanence - Vocabulary
- ISO 18921:2008 Imaging materials - Compact discs (CD-ROM) - Method for estimating the life expectancy based on the effects of temperature and relative humidity
- ISO 18925:2013 Imaging materials - Optical disc media - Storage practices
- ISO 18926:2012 Imaging materials - Information stored on magneto-optical (MO) discs - Method for estimating the life expectancy based on the effects of temperature and relative humidity
- ISO 18927:2013 Imaging materials - Recordable compact disc systems - Method for estimating the life expectancy based on the effects of temperature and relative humidity
- ISO 18933:2012 Imaging materials – Magnetic tape – Care and handling practices for extended usage
- ISO 18938:2014 Imaging materials - Optical discs - Care and handling for extended storage

== ISO 19000 – ISO 19999 ==
=== ISO 19000 – ISO 19099 ===
- ISO 19001:2013 In vitro diagnostic medical devices – Information supplied by the manufacturer with in vitro diagnostic reagents for staining in biology
- ISO 19005 Document management – Electronic document file format for long-term preservation
- ISO/TS 19006:2016 Nanotechnologies – 5-(and 6)-Chloromethyl-2’,7’ Dichloro-dihydrofluorescein diacetate (CM-H2DCF-DA) assay for evaluating nanoparticle-induced intracellular reactive oxygen species (ROS) production in RAW 264.7 macrophage cell line
- ISO 19011:2011 Guidelines for auditing management systems
- ISO 19014 Earth Moving Machinery - Functional Safety
- ISO 19017:2015 Guidance for gamma spectrometry measurement of radioactive waste
- ISO 19018:2004 Ships and marine technology - Terms, abbreviations, graphical symbols and concepts on navigation
- ISO 19019:2005 Sea-going vessels and marine technology - Instructions for planning, carrying out and reporting sea trials
- ISO 19020:2017 Microbiology of the food chain – Horizontal method for the immunoenzymatic detection of staphylococcal enterotoxins in foodstuffs
- ISO/TR 19024:2016 Evaluation of CPB devices relative to their capabilities of reducing the transmission of gaseous microemboli (GME) to a patient during cardiopulmonary bypass
- ISO 19028:2016 Accessible design - Information contents, figuration and display methods of tactile guide maps
- ISO/TS 19036:2006 Microbiology of food and animal feeding stuffs – Guidelines for the estimation of measurement uncertainty for quantitative determinations
- ISO/TR 19038:2005 Banking and related financial services – Triple DEA – Modes of operation – Implementation guidelines
- ISO 19045:2015 Ophthalmic optics – Contact lens care products – Method for evaluating Acanthamoeba encystment by contact lens care products
- ISO 19054:2005 Rail systems for supporting medical equipment
- ISO/TR 19057:2017 Nanotechnologies – Use and application of acellular in vitro tests and methodologies to assess nanomaterial biodurability
- ISO/IEC 19058:2001 Information technology – Telecommunications and information exchange between systems – Broadband Private Integrated Services Network – Inter-exchange signalling protocol – Generic functional protocol
- ISO/IEC TR 19075 Information technology database languages — Guidance for the use of database language SQL
- ISO 19079:2016 Intelligent transport systems – Communications access for land mobiles (CALM) – 6LoWPAN networking
- ISO 19080:2016 Intelligent transport systems – Communications access for land mobiles (CALM) – CoAP facility
- ISO/TR 19083 Intelligent transport systems – Emergency evacuation and disaster response and recovery
  - ISO/TR 19083-1:2016 Part 1: Framework and concept of operation
- ISO/IEC 19086 Information technology - Cloud computing - Service level agreement (SLA) framework
  - ISO/IEC 19086-1:2016 Part 1: Overview and concepts
  - ISO/IEC 19086-3:2017 Part 3: Core conformance requirements
- ISO/TS 19091:2017 Intelligent transport systems – Cooperative ITS – Using V2I and I2V communications for applications related to signalized intersections
- ISO 19092:2008 Financial services – Biometrics – Security framework
- ISO/IEC 19099:2014 Information technology - Virtualization Management Specification

=== ISO 19100 – ISO 19199 ===
- ISO 19101 Geographic information – Reference model
  - ISO 19101-1:2014 Part 1: Fundamentals
  - ISO/TS 19101-2:2008 Part 2: Imagery
- ISO/TS 19103:2015 Geographic information – Conceptual schema language
- ISO/TS 19104:2016 Geographic information – Terminology
- ISO 19105:2000 Geographic information – Conformance and testing
- ISO 19106:2004 Geographic information – Profiles
- ISO 19107:2003 Geographic information – Spatial schema
- ISO 19108:2002 Geographic information – Temporal schema
- ISO 19109:2015 Geographic information – Rules for application schema
- ISO 19110:2016 Geographic information – Methodology for feature cataloguing
- ISO 19111:2007 Geographic information – Spatial referencing by coordinates
  - ISO 19111-2:2009 Part 2: Extension for parametric values
- ISO 19112:2003 Geographic information – Spatial referencing by geographic identifiers
- ISO 19113:2002 Geographic information – Quality principles [Withdrawn: replaced by ISO 19157:2013]
- ISO 19114:2003 Geographic information – Quality evaluation procedures [Withdrawn: replaced by ISO 19157:2013]
- ISO 19115 Geographic information – Metadata
  - ISO 19115-1:2014 Part 1: Fundamentals
  - ISO 19115-2:2009 Part 2: Extensions for imagery and gridded data
  - ISO/TS 19115-3:2016 Part 3: XML schema implementation for fundamental concepts
- ISO 19116:2004 Geographic information – Positioning services
- ISO 19117:2012 Geographic information – Portrayal
- ISO 19118:2011 Geographic information – Encoding
- ISO 19119:2016 Geographic information – Services
- ISO/TR 19120:2001 Geographic information – Functional standards
- ISO/TR 19121:2000 Geographic information – Imagery and gridded data
- ISO/TR 19122:2004 Geographic information / Geomatics – Qualification and certification of personnel
- ISO 19123:2005 Geographic information – Schema for coverage geometry and functions
- ISO 19125 Geographic information – Simple feature access
- ISO 19126:2009 Geographic information – Feature concept dictionaries and registers
- ISO/TS 19127:2005 Geographic information – Geodetic codes and parameters
- ISO 19128:2005 Geographic information – Web map server interface
- ISO/TS 19129:2009 Geographic information – Imagery, gridded and coverage data framework
- ISO/TS 19130:2010 Geographic information – Imagery sensor models for geopositioning
  - ISO/TS 19130-2:2014 Part 2: SAR, InSAR, lidar and sonar
- ISO 19131:2007 Geographic information – Data product specifications
- ISO 19132:2007 Geographic information – Location-based services – Reference model
- ISO 19133:2005 Geographic information – Location-based services – Tracking and navigation
- ISO 19134:2007 Geographic information – Location-based services – Multimodal routing and navigation
- ISO 19135 Geographic information – Procedures for item registration
  - ISO 19135-1:2015 Part 1: Fundamentals
  - ISO/TS 19135-2:2012 Part 2: XML schema implementation
- ISO 19136:2007 Geographic information – Geography Markup Language (GML)
  - ISO 19136-2:2015 Part 2: Extended schemas and encoding rules
- ISO 19137:2007 Geographic information – Core profile of the spatial schema
- ISO/TS 19138:2006 Geographic information – Data quality measures [Withdrawn: replaced by ISO 19157:2013]
- ISO/TS 19139:2007 Geographic information – Metadata – XML schema implementation
  - ISO/TS 19139-2:2012 Part 2: Extensions for imagery and gridded data
- ISO 19141:2008 Geographic information – Schema for moving features
- ISO 19142:2010 Geographic information – Web Feature Service
- ISO 19143:2010 Geographic information – Filter encoding
- ISO 19144 Geographic information – Classification systems
  - ISO 19144-1:2009 Part 1: Classification system structure
  - ISO 19144-2:2012 Part 2: Land Cover Meta Language (LCML)
- ISO 19145:2013 Geographic information – Registry of representations of geographic point location
- ISO 19146:2010 Geographic information – Cross-domain vocabularies
- ISO 19147:2015 Geographic information – Transfer Nodes
- ISO 19148:2012 Geographic information – Linear referencing
- ISO 19149:2011 Geographic information – Rights expression language for geographic information - GeoREL
- ISO 19150 Geographic information – Ontology
  - ISO/TS 19150-1:2012 Part 1: Framework
  - ISO 19150-2:2015 Part 2: Rules for developing ontologies in the Web Ontology Language (OWL)
- ISO 19152:2012 Geographic information – Land Administration Domain Model (LADM)
- ISO 19153:2014 Geospatial Digital Rights Management Reference Model (GeoDRM RM)
- ISO 19154:2014 Geographic information – Ubiquitous public access – Reference model
- ISO 19155:2012 Geographic information – Place Identifier (PI) architecture
  - ISO 19155-2:2017 Part 2: Place Identifier (PI) linking
- ISO 19156 Geographic information - Observations and measurements
- ISO 19157:2013 Geographic information – Data quality
  - ISO/TS 19157-2:2016 Part 2: XML schema implementation
- ISO/TS 19158:2012 Geographic information – Quality assurance of data supply
- ISO/TS 19159 Geographic information – Calibration and validation of remote sensing imagery sensors and data
  - ISO/TS 19159-1:2014 Part 1: Optical sensors
  - ISO/TS 19159-2:2016 Part 2: Lidar
- ISO 19160 Addressing
  - ISO 19160-1:2015 Part 1: Conceptual model
- ISO 19162:2015 Geographic information – Well-known text representation of coordinate reference systems
- ISO/TS 19163 Geographic information – Content components and encoding rules for imagery and gridded data
  - ISO/TS 19163-1:2016 Part 1: Content model
- ISO 19165-1:2018 Geographic information – Preservation of digital data and metadata – Part 1: Fundamentals

=== ISO 19200 – ISO 19299 ===
- ISO/TR 19201:2013 Mechanical vibration – Methodology for selecting appropriate machinery vibration standards
- ISO 19204:2017 Soil quality - Procedure for site-specific ecological risk assessment of soil contamination (soil quality TRIAD approach)
- ISO 19213:2017 Implants for surgery – Test methods of material for use as a cortical bone model
- ISO/IEC TS 19216:2018 Programming Languages – C++ Extensions for Networking
- ISO/IEC TS 19217:2015 Information technology - Programming languages - C++ Extensions for concepts
- ISO/TS 19218 Medical devices – Hierarchical coding structure for adverse events
  - ISO/TS 19218-1:2011 Part 1: Event-type codes
  - ISO/TS 19218-2:2012 Part 2: Evaluation codes
- ISO/TR 19231:2014 Health informatics – Survey of mHealth projects in low and middle income countries (LMIC)
- ISO 19233 Implants for surgery – Orthopaedic joint prosthesis
  - ISO 19233-1:2017 Part 1: Procedure for producing parametric 3D bone models from CT data of the knee
- ISO/TR 19234:2016 Hydrometry – Low cost baffle solution to aid fish passage at triangular profile weirs that conform to ISO 4360
- ISO 19238:2014 Radiological protection - Performance criteria for service laboratories performing biological dosimetry by cytogenetics
- ISO/TR 19244:2014 Guidance on transition periods for standards developed by ISO/TC 84 – Devices for administration of medicinal products and catheters
- ISO 19250:2010 Water quality – Detection of Salmonella spp.
- ISO/TS 19256:2016 Health informatics – Requirements for medicinal product dictionary systems for health care
- ISO 19262:2015 Photography - Archiving Systems - Vocabulary
- ISO/TR 19263 Photography - Archiving systems
  - ISO/TR 19263-1:2017 Part 1: Best practices for digital image capture of cultural heritage material
- ISO/TS 19264 Photography - Archiving systems - Image quality analysis
  - ISO/TS 19264-1:2017 Part 1: Reflective originals
- ISO 19289:2015 Air quality – Meteorology – Siting classifications for surface observing stations on land
- ISO/TS 19299:2015 Electronic fee collection – Security framework

=== ISO 19300 – ISO 19399 ===
- ISO/TR 19300:2015 Graphic technology – Guidelines for the use of standards for print media production
- ISO/TS 19321:2015 Intelligent transport systems – Cooperative ITS – Dictionary of in-vehicle information (IVI) data structures
- ISO/TS 19337:2016 Nanotechnologies – Characteristics of working suspensions of nano-objects for in vitro assays to evaluate inherent nano-object toxicity
- ISO 19343:2017 Microbiology of the food chain – Detection and quantification of histamine in fish and fishery products – HPLC method
- ISO 19361:2017 Measurement of radioactivity - Determination of beta emitters activities - Test method using liquid scintillation counting
- ISO/IEC 19369:2014 Information technology – Telecommunications and information exchange between systems – NFCIP-2 test methods
- ISO/IEC 19395:2015 Information technology - Sustainability for and by information technology - Smart data centre resource monitoring and control

=== ISO 19400 – ISO 19499 ===
- ISO 19403 Paints and varnishes – Wettability
  - ISO 19403-1:2017 Part 1: Terminology and general principles
  - ISO 19403-2:2017 Part 2: Determination of the surface free energy of solid surfaces by measuring the contact angle
  - ISO 19403-3:2017 Part 3: Determination of the surface tension of liquids using the pendant drop method
  - ISO 19403-4:2017 Part 4: Determination of the polar and dispersive fractions of the surface tension of liquids from an interfacial tension
  - ISO 19403-5:2017 Part 5: Determination of the polar and dispersive fractions of the surface tension of liquids from contact angles measurements on a solid with only a disperse contribution to its surface energy
  - ISO 19403-6:2017 Part 6: Measurement of dynamic contact angle
  - ISO 19403-7:2017 Part 7: Measurement of the contact angle on a tilt stage (roll-off angle)
- ISO/TS 19408:2015 Footwear – Sizing – Vocabulary and terminology
- ISO 19439 Enterprise integration – Framework for enterprise modelling
- ISO 19440 Enterprise integration – Constructs for enterprise modelling
- ISO 19443:2018 Quality management in the supply chain for the Nuclear industry, based on ISO9001, to optimize safety and quality in supplying products and services (ITNS)
- ISO 19444 Document management - XML Forms Data Format
  - ISO 19444-1:2016 Part 1: Use of ISO 32000-2 (XFDF 3.0)
- ISO 19445:2016 Graphic technology - Metadata for graphic arts workflow - XMP metadata for image and document proofing
- ISO/IEC TR 19446:2015 Differences between the driving licences based on the ISO/IEC 18013 series and the European Union specifications
- ISO/IEC 19459:2001 Information technology – Telecommunications and information exchange between systems – Private Integrated Services Network – Specification, functional model and information flows – Single Step Call Transfer Supplementary Service
- ISO/IEC 19460:2003 Information technology – Telecommunications and information exchange between systems – Private Integrated Services Network – Inter-exchange signalling protocol – Single Step Call Transfer supplementary service
- ISO/IEC 19464:2014 Information technology – Advanced Message Queuing Protocol (AMQP) v1.0 specification
- ISO 19465:2017 Traditional Chinese medicine - Categories of traditional Chinese medicine (TCM) clinical terminological systems
- ISO 19467:2017 Thermal performance of windows and doors - Determination of solar heat gain coefficient using solar simulator
- ISO/CIE 19476:2014 Characterization of the performance of illuminance meters and luminance meters
- ISO/TR 19480:2005 Polyethylene pipes and fittings for the supply of gaseous fuels or water – Training and assessment of fusion operators
- ISO 19496 Vitreous and porcelain enamels - Terminology
  - ISO 19496-1:2017 Part 1: Terms and definitions
  - ISO 19496-2:2017 Part 2: Visual representations and descriptions
- ISO/TR 19498:2015 Ophthalmic optics and instruments – Correlation of optotypes

=== ISO 19500 – ISO 19599 ===
- ISO/IEC 19500 Information technology - Object Management Group - Common Object Request Broker Architecture (CORBA)
  - ISO/IEC 19500-1:2012 Part 1: Interfaces
  - ISO/IEC 19500-2:2012 Part 2: Interoperability
  - ISO/IEC 19500-3:2012 Part 3: Components
- ISO/IEC 19501 Information technology – Open Distributed Processing – Unified Modeling Language (UML) Version 1.4.2
- ISO/IEC 19502 Information technology – Meta Object Facility (MOF)
- ISO/IEC 19503 Information technology – XML Metadata Interchange (XMI)
- ISO/IEC 19505 Information technology - Object Management Group Unified Modeling Language (OMG UML)
  - ISO/IEC 19505-1:2012 Part 1: Infrastructure
  - ISO/IEC 19505-2:2012 Part 2: Superstructure
- ISO/IEC 19506:2012 Information technology—Object Management Group Architecture-Driven Modernization (ADM) - Knowledge Discovery Meta-Model (KDM)
- ISO/IEC 19507:2012 Information technology - Object Management Group Object Constraint Language (OCL)
- ISO/IEC 19508:2014 Information technology - Object Management Group Meta Object Facility (MOF) Core
- ISO/IEC 19509:2014 Information technology - Object Management Group XML Metadata Interchange (XMI)
- ISO/IEC 19510:2013 Information technology - Object Management Group Business Process Model and Notation
- ISO/IEC 19514:2017 Information technology - Object management group systems modeling language (OMG SysML)
- ISO/IEC 19516:2020 Information technology — Object management group — Interface definition language (IDL) 4.2
- ISO/IEC TR 19566 Information technology - JPEG Systems
  - ISO/IEC TR 19566-1:2016 Part 1: Packaging of information using codestreams and file formats
  - ISO/IEC TR 19566-2:2016 Part 2: Transport mechanisms and packaging
- ISO/IEC TS 19568:2017 Programming Languages - C++ Extensions for Library Fundamentals
- ISO/IEC TS 19570:2018 Programming Languages – Technical Specification for C++ Extensions for Parallelism
- ISO/IEC TS 19571:2016 Programming Languages - Technical specification for C++ extensions for concurrency
- ISO/TS 19590:2017 Nanotechnologies – Size distribution and concentration of inorganic nanoparticles in aqueous media via single particle inductively coupled plasma mass spectrometry
- ISO/IEC 19592 Information technology - Security techniques - Secret sharing
  - ISO/IEC 19592-1:2016 Part 1: General

=== ISO 19600 – ISO 19699 ===
- ISO 19600 Compliance management systems - Guidelines
- ISO/TR 19601:2017 Nanotechnologies – Aerosol generation for air exposure studies of nano-objects and their aggregates and agglomerates (NOAA)
- ISO 19611:2017 Traditional Chinese medicine – Air extraction cupping device
- ISO 19614:2017 Traditional Chinese medicine – Pulse graph force transducer
- ISO/IEC 19637:2016 Information technology – Sensor network testing framework
- ISO/TR 19639:2015 Electronic fee collection – Investigation of EFC standards for common payment schemes for multi-modal transport services
- ISO 19649:2017 Mobile robots - Vocabulary
- ISO 19650 Organization and digitization of information about buildings and civil engineering works, including building information modelling (BIM) — Information management using building information modelling
  - Part 1:2018 Concepts and principles
  - Part 2:2018 Delivery phase of the assets
  - Part 3:2020 Operational phase of the assets
  - Part 4:2022 Information exchange
  - Part 5:2020 Security-minded approach to information management
  - Part 6:2025 Health and safety information
- ISO/TR 19664:2017 Human response to vibration – Guidance and terminology for instrumentation and equipment for the assessment of daily vibration exposure at the workplace according to the requirements of health and safety
- ISO/IEC 19678:2015 Information Technology - BIOS Protection Guidelines

=== ISO 19700 – ISO 19799 ===
- ISO 19709 Transport packaging - Small load container systems
  - ISO 19709-1:2016 Part 1: Common requirements and test methods
  - ISO/TS 19709-2:2016 Part 2: Column Stackable System (CSS)
  - ISO/TS 19709-3:2016 Part 3: Bond Stackable System (BSS)
- ISO/TR 19716:2016 Nanotechnologies – Characterization of cellulose nanocrystals
- ISO 19719:2010 Machine tools - Work holding chucks - Vocabulary
- ISO 19720 Building construction machinery and equipment – Plants for the preparation of concrete and mortar
  - ISO 19720-1:2017 Part 1: Terminology and commercial specifications
- ISO/TR 19727:2017 Medical devices – Pump tube spallation test – General procedure
- ISO 19731:2017 Digital analytics and web analyses for purposes of market, opinion and social research - Vocabulary and service requirements
- ISO/IEC 19752 Information technology – Method for the determination of toner cartridge yield for monochromatic electrophotographic printers and multi-function devices that contain printer components
- ISO/IEC TR 19755:2003 Information technology - Programming languages, their environments and system software interfaces - Object finalization for programming language COBOL
- ISO/IEC 19756:2011 Information technology - Topic Maps - Constraint Language (TMCL)
- ISO/IEC 19757 Information technology – Document Schema Definition Languages (DSDL)
  - ISO/IEC 19757-2:2008 Part 2: Regular-grammar-based validation – RELAX NG
  - ISO/IEC 19757-3:2016 Part 3: Rule-based validation – Schematron
  - ISO/IEC 19757-4:2006 Part 4: Namespace-based Validation Dispatching Language (NVDL)
  - ISO/IEC 19757-5:2011 Part 5: Extensible Datatypes
  - ISO/IEC 19757-7:2009 Part 7: Character Repertoire Description Language (CREPDL)
  - ISO/IEC 19757-8:2008 Part 8: Document Semantics Renaming Language (DSRL)
  - ISO/IEC 19757-11:2011 Part 11: Schema association
- ISO/IEC TR 19758:2003 Information technology - Document description and processing languages - DSSSL library for complex compositions
- ISO/IEC TR 19759:2015 Software Engineering - Guide to the software engineering body of knowledge (SWEBOK)
- ISO/IEC 19761:2011 Software engineering - COSMIC: a functional size measurement method
- ISO/IEC 19762:2016 Information technology - Automatic identification and data capture (AIDC) techniques - Harmonized vocabulary
- ISO/IEC 19763 Information technology - Metamodel framework for interoperability (MFI)
  - ISO/IEC 19763-1:2015 Part 1: Framework
  - ISO/IEC 19763-3:2010 Part 3: Metamodel for ontology registration
  - ISO/IEC 19763-5:2015 Part 5: Metamodel for process model registration
  - ISO/IEC 19763-6:2015 Part 6: Registry Summary
  - ISO/IEC 19763-7:2015 Part 7: Metamodel for service model registration
  - ISO/IEC 19763-8:2015 Part 8: Metamodel for role and goal model registration
  - ISO/IEC TR 19763-9:2015 Part 9: On demand model selection
  - ISO/IEC 19763-10:2014 Part 10: Core model and basic mapping
  - ISO/IEC 19763-12:2015 Part 12: Metamodel for information model registration
  - ISO/IEC TS 19763-13:2016 Part 13: Metamodel for form design registration
- ISO/IEC TR 19764:2005 Information technology – Guidelines, methodology and reference criteria for cultural and linguistic adaptability in information technology products
- ISO/IEC TR 19768:2007 Information technology - Programming languages - Technical Report on C++ Library Extensions
- ISO/IEC 19770 Information technology – Software asset management
- ISO/IEC 19772:2009 Information technology - Security techniques - Authenticated encryption
- ISO/IEC 19773:2011 Information technology - Metadata Registries (MDR) modules
- ISO/IEC 19774:2006 Information technology - Computer graphics and image processing - Humanoid Animation (H-Anim)
- ISO/IEC 19775 Information technology—Computer graphics, image processing and environmental data representation—Extensible 3D (X3D)
  - ISO/IEC 19775-1:2013 Part 1: Architecture and base components
  - ISO/IEC 19775-2:2015 Part 2: Scene access interface (SAI)
- ISO/IEC 19776 Information technology - Computer graphics, image processing and environmental data representation - Extensible 3D (X3D) encodings
  - ISO/IEC 19776-1:2015 Part 1: Extensible Markup Language (XML) encoding
  - ISO/IEC 19776-2:2015 Part 2: Classic VRML encoding
  - ISO/IEC 19776-3:2015 Part 3: Compressed binary encoding
- ISO/IEC 19777 Information technology - Computer graphics and image processing - Extensible 3D (X3D) language bindings
  - ISO/IEC 19777-1:2006 Part 1: ECMAScript
  - ISO/IEC 19777-2:2006 Part 2: Java
- ISO/IEC 19778 Information technology - Learning, education and training - Collaborative technology - Collaborative workplace
  - ISO/IEC 19778-1:2015 Part 1: Collaborative workplace data model
  - ISO/IEC 19778-2:2015 Part 2: Collaborative environment data model
  - ISO/IEC 19778-3:2015 Part 3: Collaborative group data model
- ISO/IEC 19780 Information technology - Learning, education and training - Collaborative technology - Collaborative learning communication
  - ISO/IEC 19780-1:2015 Part 1: Text-based communication
- ISO/IEC TR 19782:2006 Information technology - Automatic identification and data capture techniques - Effects of gloss and low substrate opacity on reading of bar code symbols
- ISO/IEC 19784 Information technology – Biometric application programming interface
  - ISO/IEC 19784-1:2006 Part 1: BioAPI specification
  - ISO/IEC 19784-2:2007 Part 2: Biometric archive function provider interface
  - ISO/IEC 19784-4:2011 Part 4: Biometric sensor function provider interface
- ISO/IEC 19785 Information technology – Common Biometric Exchange Formats Framework
  - ISO/IEC 19785-1:2015 Part 1: Data element specification
  - ISO/IEC 19785-2:2006 Part 2: Procedures for the operation of the Biometric Registration Authority
  - ISO/IEC 19785-3:2015 Part 3: Patron format specifications
  - ISO/IEC 19785-4:2010 Part 4: Security block format specifications
- ISO/IEC 19788 Information technology – Learning, education and training – Metadata for learning resources
- ISO/IEC 19790:2012 Information technology – Security techniques – Security requirements for cryptographic modules
- ISO/IEC TR 19791:2010 Information technology - Security techniques - Security assessment of operational systems
- ISO/IEC 19792:2009 Information technology - Security techniques - Security evaluation of biometrics
- ISO/IEC 19793 Information technology - Open Distributed Processing—Use of UML for ODP system specifications
- ISO/IEC 19794 Information technology – Biometric data interchange formats
  - ISO/IEC 19794-1:2011 Part 1: Framework
  - ISO/IEC 19794-2:2011 Part 2: Finger minutiae data
  - ISO/IEC 19794-3:2006 Part 3: Finger pattern spectral data
  - ISO/IEC 19794-4:2011 Part 4: Finger image data
  - ISO/IEC 19794-5:2011 Part 5: Face image data
  - ISO/IEC 19794-6:2011 Part 6: Iris image data
  - ISO/IEC 19794-7:2014 Part 7: Signature/sign time series data
  - ISO/IEC 19794-8:2011 Part 8: Finger pattern skeletal data
  - ISO/IEC 19794-9:2011 Part 9: Vascular image data
  - ISO/IEC 19794-10:2007 Part 10: Hand geometry silhouette data
  - ISO/IEC 19794-11:2013 Part 11: Signature/sign processed dynamic data
  - ISO/IEC 19794-14:2013 Part 14: DNA data
  - ISO/IEC 19794-15:2017 Part 15: Palm crease image data
- ISO/IEC 19795 Information technology – Biometric performance testing and reporting
  - ISO/IEC 19795-1:2006 Part 1: Principles and framework
  - ISO/IEC 19795-2:2007 Part 2: Testing methodologies for technology and scenario evaluation
  - ISO/IEC TR 19795-3:2007 Part 3: Modality-specific testing
  - ISO/IEC 19795-4:2008 Part 4: Interoperability performance testing
  - ISO/IEC 19795-5:2011 Part 5: Access control scenario and grading scheme
  - ISO/IEC 19795-6:2012 Part 6: Testing methodologies for operational evaluation
  - ISO/IEC 19795-7:2011 Part 7: Testing of on-card biometric comparison algorithms
- ISO/IEC 19796 Information technology - Learning, education and training - Quality management, assurance and metrics
  - ISO/IEC 19796-1:2005 Part 1: General approach
  - ISO/IEC 19796-3:2009 Part 3: Reference methods and metrics

=== ISO 19800 – ISO 19899 ===
- ISO/TR 19814:2017 Information and documentation - Collections management for archives and libraries
- ISO/IEC 19831:2015 Cloud Infrastructure Management Interface (CIMI) Model and RESTful HTTP-based Protocol – An Interface for Managing Cloud Infrastructure
- ISO/TR 19838:2016 Microbiology – Cosmetics – Guidelines for the application of ISO standards on Cosmetic Microbiology
- ISO/IEC TS 19841:2015 Technical Specification for C++ Extensions for Transactional Memory
- ISO/TS 19844:2016 Health informatics – Identification of medicinal products – Implementation guidelines for data elements and structures for the unique identification and exchange of regulated information on substances
- ISO/IEC 19845:2015 Information technology - Universal business language version 2.1 (UBL v2.1)
- ISO 19859:2016 Gas turbine applications – Requirements for power generation
- ISO 19891 Ships and marine technology - Specifications for gas detectors intended for use on board ships
  - ISO 19891-1:2017 Part 1: Portable gas detectors for atmosphere testing of enclosed spaces

=== ISO 19900 – ISO 19999 ===
- ISO/TR 19948:2016 Earth-moving machinery – Conformity assessment and certification process
- ISO 19952:2005 Footwear – Vocabulary
- ISO/TS 19979:2014 Ophthalmic optics – Contact lenses – Hygienic management of multipatient use trial contact lenses
- ISO 19980:2012 Ophthalmic instruments – Corneal topographers
- ISO/IEC 19987:2015 Information technology - EPC Information services - Specification
- ISO/IEC 19988:2015 Information technology - GS1 Core Business Vocabulary (CBV)
- ISO 19993 Timber structures—Glued laminated timber—Face and edge joint cleavage test
