= Josef Preishuber-Pflügl =

Austrian technology leader

Josef Preishuber-Pflügl IEC 1906 Award ceremony November 2011

Josef Preishuber-Pflügl is an Austrian technology leader.

He is an RFID, NFC and IoT expert who served as project editor of various international RFID standards, such as ISO/IEC 18000-4 "2.45 GHz air interface", ISO/IEC 18000-6" General UHF RFID air interface", ISO/IEC 18000-63 "Type C: UHF RFID air interface", ISO/IEC 18000-7 "433 MHz Active RFID air interface", ISO/IEC 29143 "Air interface for Mobile Item Identification Methods", and ISO/IEC 29167-1 "RFID Security".

== Career ==
Josef Preishuber-Pflügl
- Born: 1971 (age 54–55); Austria
- Education: TU Graz (DI)
- Known for: ISO/IEC 18000-63; EN 302 208
- Awards: IEC 1906 Award (2011); Ted Williams Award (2019)
- Scientific career
- Fields: RFID; NFC; IoT
- Workplaces: innobir; CISC Semiconductor; Philips Semiconductors

Preishuber-Pflügl was a design engineer, project manager and product manager at Philips Semiconductors, where he got involved in RFID for his diploma thesis. His work led him through the development of LF (<135 kHz), HF (13.56 MHz) and UHF (860-960 MHz) RFID products and systems.

Changing to CISC Semiconductor GmbH from 2003-2023, Preishuber-Pflügl set up the company's RFID and NFC activities and expanded the international standardization work on RFID. In 2003 he became convener of ISO/IEC JTC 1 SC31 WG3/SG1 "RFID performance and conformance test methods", which continued its work as WG4/SG6 since 2008. The group developed the performance and conformance standards ISO/IEC 18046 and ISO/IEC 18047 applicable for ISO/IEC 18000 RFID testing. In 2014 he became convener of ISO/IEC JTC 1 SC31 WG7 "RFID Security", which develops ISO/IEC 29167. Currently, he is driver in standardization in ISO/IEC, CENELEC, ETSI and GS1 EPCglobal and convener of ISO/IEC JTC 1 SC31 WG4 "RF Communications" that covers RFID, RTLS, Security and related conformance and performance test methods.

In 2011 he received the IEC 1906 Award by the International Electrotechnical Commission (IEC) as Expert of ISO/IEC JTC 1, Information Technology.

In 2012 he became co-author of the RFID Handbook of Klaus Finkenzeller.

In the intensive discussion of Internet of Things (IoT) and RFID he first used the term "RFID/NFC providing the last meter of the IoT", which derived from the common term "last kilometer" in infrastructure networks. The Anglo-American terms "last mile" was first used in public in his speech on "RFID and NFC: Providing the Last Yards for IoT" on 8 October 2015. As input for the ISO/IEC JTC 1 Plenary the respective committee SC31 used then "IoT's First Meter".

In 2019 he received the AIM Ted Williams Award, followed by the highest AIM award, the Richard Dilling Award, in 2023.

In 2023 he founded his own company innobir GmbH offering wireless technology services with the particular focus on NFC, RAIN RFID and UWB, as well as on international standardization and radio regulations.
