= WXXM (data model) =

Markup language which enables the management and distribution of weather data

The Weather Information Exchange Model (WXXM) is designed to enable the management and distribution of weather data in digital format (XML). WXXM version 2.0, set to be finalized in 2014, is based on Geography Markup Language (GML) and is one of the GML Application Schemas. It is being developed by the US Federal Aviation Administration (FAA) and the European Organisation for the Safety of Air Navigation (EUROCONTROL). WXXM is a member of a family of data models designed for use in aviation safety, notably Aeronautical Information Exchange Model (AIXM) and the Flight Information Exchange Model (FIXM).

== Purpose ==
As of 2014, WXXM is an extension of IWXXM, which represents the operationally exchanged meteorological information defined by the International Civil Aviation Organization (ICAO). WXXM uses a similar design approach to IWXXM, but can represent additional types of weather information not covered in IWXXM.

== Model ==
WXXM has two main components. The package as a whole is referred to as WXXM:

- The WXXM Conceptual Model (WXCM)
- The WXXM XML Schema (WXXS)

== History ==
WXXM 1.0 was introduced in 2007, representing METAR, SPECI, TAF, SIGMET and other ICAO information as specified in International Civil Aviation Organization (ICAO) Annex III.

WXXM 1.1 was released in 2010 with a number of additional products beyond ICAO Annex 3.

WXXM 2.0 was released in 2014 as a major update. WXXM 2.0 removed data products that are authoritatively represented by ICAO in IWXXM 1.0 (METAR, SPECI, TAF, SIGMET) and incorporated IWXXM 1.0 design approaches.

=== WXXM Conceptual Model ===
The WXXM Conceptual Model is a conceptual model of the meteorological domain. It describes the features and their properties (attributes and associations) within the domain. Therefore, it can be used as the logical basis for weather databases.

The model is designed using the Unified Modelling Language (UML).

=== WXXM XML Schema ===
The WXXM XML Schema is an exchange model for weather data. It is an implementation of the Conceptual Model as an XML schema. Therefore, it can be used to send weather information to others in the form of XML encoded data, enabling systems to exchange weather information.

== See also ==
- AIXM
- IWXXM
- TAF
- METAR
- SPECI
- SIGMET
