= SOSI =

SOSI is a geospatial vector data format predominantly used for exchange of geographical information in Norway.

SOSI is short for Samordnet Opplegg for Stedfestet Informasjon (literally "Coordinated Approach for Spatial Information", but more commonly expanded in English to Systematic Organization of Spatial Information).

The standard includes standardized definitions for geometry and topology, data quality, coordinate systems, attributes and metadata.

The open standard was developed by the Norwegian Mapping and Cadastre Authority. It was first published in 1987 (version 1.0). It is continuously being revised and further developed. The long term development points towards international standards (ISO 19100). This work is being done by ISO/TC211, currently chaired by Olaf Østensen with the Norwegian Mapping and Cadastre Authority.
