= AIXM =

Aeronautical data exchange format

The Aeronautical Information Exchange Model (AIXM) is designed to enable the management and distribution of Aeronautical Information Services (AIS) data in digital format. AIXM is based on Geography Markup Language (GML) and is one of the GML Application Schemas which is applicable for the Aeronautical domain. It was developed by the US Federal Aviation Administration (FAA), the US National Geospatial Intelligence Agency (NGA) and the European Organisation for the Safety of Air Navigation (EUROCONTROL).The current version is AIXM 5.1.1.

== Model ==
AIXM has two main components:

- The Aeronautical Information Conceptual Model
- The AIXM XML Schema

=== The Aeronautical Information Conceptual Model ===
The Aeronautical Information Conceptual Model (AICM) is a conceptual model of the aeronautical domain. It describes the features and their properties (attributes and associations) within the domain. Therefore, it can be used as the logical basis for Aeronautical Information Management databases and AIXM.

The model is designed using the Unified Modelling Language (UML).

=== AIXM XML Schema ===
The AIXM XML Schema is an exchange model for aeronautical data and a concrete implementation of AICM. It is an implementation of the Conceptual Model as an XML schema. Therefore, it can be used to send aeronautical information to others in the form of XML encoded data, enabling systems to exchange aeronautical information.

== Purpose ==
The aim of AIXM is to allow for the management and distribution of AIS data in a digital format. This includes information such as airport area data, airspace structures, organisations and units, points and navaids, procedures, routes and flying restrictions. Current versions are also designed to be able to manage and distribute the full timeline of aeronautical data, including temporary updates. These features form a key part of the EUROCONTROL backed move from AIS to Aeronautical Information Management (AIM), the transition from using data based on paper documentation and telex messages to using solely digital data.

== History ==
Development of AIXM was initially started in order to facilitate the development of the European AIS Database (EAD). The development of AICM was started in 1996, with an initial release in 1997, which allowed for the development of the AIXM XML Schema. Initial developments were “SQL-based”, with development moving to XML in 1999. The first version of the schema was released in 1999 as AICM/AIXM 2.1 with further development leading to an updated version, AICM/AIXM 3.3 in 2002. This then allowed the EAD to begin operations in 2003.

After this, EUROCONTROL began a partnership with the FAA and the US National Geospatial Intelligence Agency in order to further develop AIXM for international usage and cover global civilian and military needs. The AIXM Change Control Board (ACCB) was set up to allow for international states and industries to participate in the development of AIXM. In 2004 AIXM 4.0 was released with an update (4.5) in 2005 which was the first version to incorporate suggestions from the ACCB and the international community.

=== Version 5.0 ===
Developed through a public design review at the 2006 Global AIM Congress, AIXM 5.0 was the first full UML- and XML Schema–based release, establishing a modular and extensible foundation for future growth. It aligned the format with ISO 19100 geospatial standards, including compliance with GML, and introduced an initial version of the temporality concept, enabling digital event updates and laying the groundwork for digital NOTAM. The scope of the model was expanded beyond airspace to include airport and procedure data structures, providing a more comprehensive digital representation of aeronautical information. This version is still used by some early adopters, including the FAA.

=== Version 5.1 ===
Reinforced the notion of temporality through the Temporality Concept v1.0, establishing guidelines for managing permanent and temporary data changes, timesheets, and schedules. It standardized feature identification with UUIDs and XLink referencing between features. To support code generation, the UML/XSD structures were updated to define ownership of objects and features more formally. A dedicated GML 3.2.1 profile was introduced to harmonize geometric encodings. The content was also expanded to cover new airport, ground facility, procedural, obstacle, and navigational features.

=== Version 5.1.1 ===
Fully backwards/forward compatible with AIXM 5.1. Introduced Temporality Concept v1.1, a refinement that clarified and enforced consistency rules without structural change. Addressed numerous schema bugs: corrected value lists, added nilReason where missing, and expanded allowable values (e.g. “electric” engine type). The UML model migrated to Sparx Enterprise Architect, with regenerated XML Schemas that now reference GML 3.2.1 remotely instead of embedding copies. It was the first version formally governed by the AIXM Change Control Board (CCB).

=== Version 5.2 ===
Introduced unique identifiers for complex AIXM objects and upgraded alignment to GML 3.2.2, removing certain constructs (Orientable/Composite Curves) and tightening rules such as disallowing srsName in feature envelopes. Expanded content to cover GNSS infrastructures (GNSS, SBAS, GBAS), integrated ICAO requirements for runway condition reporting and Performance-Based Navigation (PBN), and introduced the DesignStandard object for associating features with design criteria. While AIP, obstacle, and airport mapping datasets remain based on 5.1.1, this version is the first to formally support ICAO Instrument Flight Procedure datasets. The technical documentation has not yet been released.

== AIXM Viewers ==
Whilst AIXM does use GML standards, it cannot be viewed with standard GML viewers as aeronautical data requires specialised processing. EUROCONTROL and the FAA maintain a list of AIXM viewers developed by EUROCONTROL, Luciad and Snowflake Software (now part of Cirium). EUROCONTROL also maintains a list of free sample data that can be used with these viewers.

In addition to these viewers an open-source tools Delorean provide functionality to create, visualize, and work with AIXM datasets. It is a Java-based application that integrates with PostgreSQL, PostGIS, and QGIS to. While it remains in development, it currently supports aixm 5.1 and aixm 5.1.1, it can render geometries, navigate the aixm data tree and merge and export aixm datasets.
