= Fixed Acquirer Network Fee =

Fee Visa Inc. charges merchants

The Fixed Acquirer Network Fee (FANF) is a fee that Visa began assessing each of its merchants for in April 2012. Ranging from US$1.25 to $380,000, it is based on the size of the merchant. For example, a high-volume merchant category code (MCC) with over 4,000 locations would have to pay a price near the top of the spectrum, while a small business would end up paying somewhere near the bottom.
