= Yahoo Maps =

Website

Yahoo! Maps
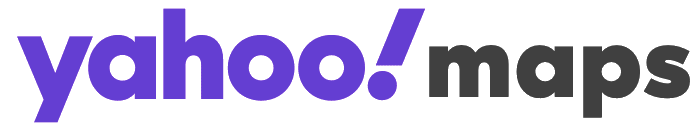
- Logo (original)
- Website type: Web mapping
- Available in: Multilingual
- Owner: Yahoo!
- Website: https://search.yahoo.com/
- Commercial: Yes
- Registration: No
- Launched: March 7, 2002; 24 years ago (original) 2019 (revival)
- Current status: Defunct (original (2015)/revival (2019))

Yahoo! Maps was a free online mapping portal provided by Yahoo! Functionality included local weather powered by The Weather Channel, printing maps, and local reviews powered by Yelp. It was shut down on June 30, 2015. For a limited time until 2019, Yahoo! Maps could be accessed in the United States on Yahoo Search, albeit powered by Here WeGo. However, that is no longer possible.

== Map data ==
The street network and other vector data Yahoo! Maps used later on was from HERE, and included several public data sources. Detailed street network data is currently available for the United States, Canada, Puerto Rico, the Virgin Islands, and most European countries. Country borders, cities, and water bodies are mapped for the rest of the world.

Low-resolution satellite imagery is available worldwide. 1–2 meter resolution is available for most of the contiguous United States and select cities worldwide.

== History ==
Yahoo! Local Maps in beta (2005)

Yahoo! Maps originally launched circa 1998. The data was provided by Vicinity Corporation.

A new Adobe Flash-based version called Yahoo! Local Maps was released in Beta in November 2005. In April 2006, aerial and satellite views were added.

On May 16, 2007, Yahoo! released a new map style designed by the cartography company Cartifact. Data and imagery were also supplied by Cartifact, including shaded relief showing land surface features and land cover coloring indicating major environmental zones.

At some point before May 2007, maps of India were added to Yahoo Search, which is a non-Flash interface to Yahoo Maps. In addition to reasonably detailed Indian coverage (not available through its Yahoo Search engine), to allow users to browse/search within Yahoo!. In May 2010, Yahoo! reached a deal with Nokia whereby Nokia's mapping service (later known as Here) would power Yahoo! Maps. This came into effect in October 2011.

In 2014, a mobile site for Yahoo! Maps was released.

On June 4, 2015, Yahoo! announced that Yahoo! Maps would be shut down, along with Yahoo! Pipes, at the end of the month.

== Functions ==
The main Yahoo! Maps site offered street maps and driving directions for the United States and Canada. It had the following notable features:

- Address Book: Registered Yahoo! users can store a list of commonly used street addresses, making it unnecessary to type them in again. A recently entered address can be quickly recalled by selecting one from a drop-down list.
- Live Traffic: Traffic incident markers and current highway conditions can be viewed on the map.
- Find On The Map: A local search by business name or category can be typed into the "Find On The Map" box to locate it in the current map view. A list of clickable points of interest categories is also available. The results can be further refined by user rating or related category.
- Driving Directions: Driving directions can be displayed on a map or in printable form, with optional turn-by-turn maps, or as simple text. Links to driving directions can be emailed, and text directions can be sent to mobile phones. Multi-point driving directions: Multiple addresses can be entered and manually reordered for complex driving directions.
- Draggable maps: The map view can be manipulated by dragging it with the mouse or tapping the arrow keys. Zoom level can be controlled via the mouse scroll wheel, "Page Up"/"Page Down" keys, or the map's zoom bar.
- Widgets: Several widgets over the map include a navigator widget, a map type (with satellites), hybrid cars, controllers, and zooming levels control.
- Satellite Imagery: Labelled (hybrid) and unlabelled satellite imagery is available worldwide.
- Overview map: A collapsible overview map provides context, with a draggable grey area controlling the main map view.
- International Coverage: Outside the US and Canada, Yahoo! Maps Beta can recognize city, province, and country names, and provide a small-scale map or satellite views.
- Right click to set waypoint: an origin, destination, or midpoint can be set by right-clicking on the desired location on the map.
- Draggable markers: Any marker can be dragged to the 'Get Map' text entry area to add that location to a route.

== Developer API ==
Until December 2011, developers could embed Yahoo! Maps into their own web pages (to create a mashup) through the Yahoo! Maps Developer APIs. The Yahoo! Maps APIs came in three basic flavors:

- The Flash APIs, which used the Adobe Flash platform. Three variations, allowing the developer to write in JavaScript, ActionScript, or Adobe Flex 1.5, were available.
- The Ajax API, for interactive maps that use capabilities inherent in web browsers, without using the Flash plug-in. Ajax applications are written in JavaScript.
- The "Simple" API, basically an XML data format, an extension of GeoRSS, for displaying point of interest data on top of Yahoo!'s main map site. The Flash and Ajax APIs also supported display of GeoRSS formatted data.

Yahoo! offered a number of low-level APIs to support maps, for geocoding, getting a map image, searching for a local business, or retrieving traffic information. Some other Yahoo! services, such as Flickr and Upcoming.org, have their content available through web services, with interesting potential for mashups.

== See also ==
- Comparison of web map services
- Traffic Message Channel
