= Immich =

Image and video management software

- Developers: Immich-team, FUTO
- Release: February 6, 2022; 4 years ago
- Stable release: 3.3.5 / 21 October 2026
- Written in: TypeScript, Dart, Python
- Type: Image organizer
- Website: immich.app
- Repository: github.com/immich-app/immich

Immich is a self-hosted free and open-source photo and video management application. The first version was released in February 2022. In October 2025 version 2.0.0 was released, which the team marked as the first stable version of the software.

== History ==
In October 2025 with the release of version 2.0.0, the first stable release, the project switched to semantic versioning.

In May 2024 the core team announced they would partner with FUTO, an organization building and funding independent software, which would give them the funds to work on the project full time.

== Features ==
Immich runs on a server that stores the user's media files. The interface organizes media on a chronological timeline, on a map view using GIS metadata, with support for albums and shareable links.

The software consists of two components. The server-side software with a web-interface and a mobile app for Android and iOS. The mobile app can automatically synchronise media on a device with the server.

Immich includes an automatic face and object detection algorithm for tagging photos and a memories feature, surfacing past photos on a recurring basis.

== Technology ==
Immich server is written primarily using TypeScript, Dart and Python. It works on Linux, MacOS and Windows and is also distributed using Docker containers.
