= Geospatial metadata =

Metadata used for describing geospatial data

Geospatial metadata (also geographic metadata) is a type of metadata applicable to geographic data and information. Such objects may be stored in a geographic information system (GIS) or may simply be documents, data-sets, images or other objects, services, or related items that exist in some other native environment but whose features may be appropriate to describe in a (geographic) metadata catalog (may also be known as a data directory or data inventory).

== Definition ==
ISO 19115:2013 "Geographic Information – Metadata" from ISO/TC 211, the industry standard for geospatial metadata, describes its scope as follows:

[This standard] provides information about the identification, the extent, the quality, the spatial and temporal aspects, the content, the spatial reference, the portrayal, distribution, and other properties of digital geographic data and services.

ISO 19115:2013 also provides for non-digital mediums:

Though this part of ISO 19115 is applicable to digital data and services, its principles can be extended to many other types of resources such as maps, charts, and textual documents as well as non-geographic data.

The U.S. Federal Geographic Data Committee (FGDC) describes geospatial metadata as follows:

A metadata record is a file of information, usually presented as an XML document, which captures the basic characteristics of a data or information resource. It represents the who, what, when, where, why and how of the resource. Geospatial metadata commonly document geographic digital data such as Geographic Information System (GIS) files, geospatial databases, and earth imagery but can also be used to document geospatial resources including data catalogs, mapping applications, data models and related websites. Metadata records include core library catalog elements such as Title, Abstract, and Publication Data; geographic elements such as Geographic Extent and Projection Information; and database elements such as Attribute Label Definitions and Attribute Domain Values.

== History ==
The growing appreciation of the value of geospatial metadata through the 1980s and 1990s led to the development of a number of initiatives to collect metadata according to a variety of formats either within agencies, communities of practice, or countries/groups of countries. For example, NASA's "DIF" metadata format was developed during an Earth Science and Applications Data Systems Workshop in 1987, and formally approved for adoption in 1988. Similarly, the U.S. FGDC developed its geospatial metadata standard over the period 1992–1994. The Spatial Information Council of Australia and New Zealand (ANZLIC), a combined body representing spatial data interests in Australia and New Zealand, released version 1 of its "metadata guidelines" in 1996. ISO/TC 211 undertook the task of harmonizing the range of formal and de facto standards over the approximate period 1999–2002, resulting in the release of ISO 19115 "Geographic Information – Metadata" in 2003 and a subsequent revision in 2013. As of 2011 individual countries, communities of practice, agencies, etc. have started re-casting their previously used metadata standards as "profiles" or recommended subsets of ISO 19115, occasionally with the inclusion of additional metadata elements as formal extensions to the ISO standard. The growth in popularity of Internet technologies and data formats, such as Extensible Markup Language (XML) during the 1990s led to the development of mechanisms for exchanging geographic metadata on the web. In 2004, the Open Geospatial Consortium released the current version (3.1) of Geography Markup Language (GML), an XML grammar for expressing geospatial features and corresponding metadata. With the growth of the Semantic Web in the 2000s, the geospatial community has begun to develop ontologies for representing semantic geospatial metadata. Some examples include the Hydrology and Administrative ontologies developed by the Ordnance Survey in the United Kingdom.

== ISO 19115: Geographic information – Metadata ==
ISO 19115 is a standard of the International Organization for Standardization (ISO). The standard is part of the ISO geographic information suite of standards (19100 series). ISO 19115 and its parts define how to describe geographical information and associated services, including contents, spatial-temporal purchases, data quality, access and rights to use.

The objective of this International Standard is to provide a clear procedure for the description of digital geographic data-sets so that users will be able to determine whether the data in a holding will be of use to them and how to access the data. By establishing a common set of metadata terminology, definitions and extension procedures, this standard promotes the proper use and effective retrieval of geographic data.

ISO 19115 was revised in 2013 to accommodate growing use of the internet for metadata management, as well as add many new categories of metadata elements (referred to as codelists) and the ability to limit the extent of metadata use temporally or by user.

== ISO 19139 Geographic information Metadata XML schema implementation ==
ISO 19139:2012 provides the XML implementation schema for ISO 19115 specifying the metadata record format and may be used to describe, validate, and exchange geospatial metadata prepared in XML.

The standard is part of the ISO geographic information suite of standards (19100 series), and provides a spatial metadata XML (spatial metadata eXtensible Mark-up Language (smXML)) encoding, an XML schema implementation derived from ISO 19115, Geographic information – Metadata. The metadata includes information about the identification, constraint, extent, quality, spatial and temporal reference, distribution, lineage, and maintenance of the digital geographic data-set.

== Metadata directories ==
Also known as metadata catalogues or data directories.

(need discussion of, and subsections on GCMD, FGDC metadata gateway, ASDD, European and Canadian initiatives, etc. etc.)

- GIS Inventory – National GIS Inventory System which is maintained by the US-based National States Geographic Information Council (NSGIC) as a tool for the entire US GIS Community. Its primary purpose is to track data availability and the status of geographic information system (GIS) implementation in state and local governments to aid the planning and building of statewide spatial data infrastructures (SSDI). The Random Access Metadata for Online Nationwide Assessment (RAMONA) database is a critical component of the GIS Inventory. RAMONA moves its FGDC-compliant metadata (CSDGM Standard) for each data layer to a web folder and a Catalog Service for the Web (CSW) that can be harvested by Federal programs and others. This provides far greater opportunities for discovery of user information. The GIS Inventory website was originally created in 2006 by NSGIC under award NA04NOS4730011 from the Coastal Services Center, National Oceanic and Atmospheric Administration, U.S. Department of Commerce. The Department of Homeland Security has been the principal funding source since 2008 and they supported the development of the Version 5 during 2011/2012 under Order Number HSHQDC-11-P-00177. The Federal Emergency Management Agency and National Oceanic and Atmospheric Administration have provided additional resources to maintain and improve the GIS Inventory. Some US Federal programs require submission of CSDGM-Compliant Metadata for data created under grants and contracts that they issue. The GIS Inventory provides a very simple interface to create the required Metadata.
- GCMD - Global Change Master Directory's goal is to enable users to locate and obtain access to Earth science data sets and services relevant to global change and Earth science research. The GCMD database holds more than 20,000 descriptions of Earth science data sets and services covering all aspects of Earth and environmental sciences.
- ECHO - The EOS Clearing House (ECHO) is a spatial and temporal metadata registry, service registry, and order broker. It allows users to more efficiently search and access data and services through the Reverb Client or Application Programmer Interfaces (APIs). ECHO stores metadata from a variety of science disciplines and domains, totalling over 3400 Earth science data sets and over 118 million granule records.
- GoGeo - GoGeo is a service run by EDINA (University of Edinburgh) and is supported by Jisc. GoGeo allows users to conduct geographically targeted searches to discover geospatial datasets. GoGeo searches many data portals from the HE and FE community and beyond. GoGeo also allows users to create standards compliant metadata through its Geodoc metadata editor.

== Geospatial metadata tools ==
There are many proprietary GIS or geospatial products that support metadata viewing and editing on GIS resources. For example, ESRI's ArcGIS Desktop, SOCET GXP, Autodesk's AutoCAD Map 3D 2008, Arcitecta's Mediaflux and Intergraph's GeoMedia support geospatial metadata extensively.

GIS Inventory is a free web-based tool that provides a very simple interface to create geospatial metadata. Participants create a profile and document their data layers through a survey-style interface. The GIS Inventory produces metadata that is compliant with the Federal Content Standard for Digital Geospatial Metadata (CSDGM). The GIS Inventory is also capably of ingesting already completed metadata through document upload and web server connectivity. Through the GIS Inventory web services, metadata are automatically shared with US Federal agencies.

GeoNetwork opensource is a Free and Open Source Software solution to manage and publish geospatial metadata and services based on international metadata and catalog standards. The software is part of the Open Source Geospatial Foundation's software stack.

GeoCat Bridge allows users to edit, validate and directly publish metadata from ArcGIS Desktop to GeoNetwork (and generic CSW catalogs) and publishes data as map services on GeoServer. Several metadata profiles are supported.

pycsw is an OGC CSW server implementation written in Python. pycsw fully implements the OpenGIS Catalogue Service Implementation Specification (Catalogue Service for the Web). The project is certified OGC Compliant, and is an OGC Reference Implementation.

pygeometa provides a lightweight and Pythonic approach for users to easily create geospatial metadata in standards-based formats using simple configuration files (called metadata control files [MCF]). Leveraging the simple YAML format, pygeometa can generate metadata in numerous standards. Users can also create their own custom metadata formats which can be plugged into pygeometa for custom metadata format output.

The R geometa package provides facilities to read, write and validate geographic metadata defined with ISO TC211 / OGC ISO geographic information metadata standards, and encoded using the ISO 19139 and ISO 19115-3 (XML) standard technical specifications. This includes ISO 19110 (Feature cataloguing), 19115 (dataset metadata), 19119 (service metadata) and 19136 (GML).

CATMDEdit

terraCatalog

ArcCatalog

ArcGIS Server Portal

GeoNetwork opensource

IME

M3CAT MetaD

MetaGenie

Parcs Canada Metadata Editor

Mapit/CADit

NOKIS Editor
