= Tiki Wiki CMS Groupware =

Content management software

- Developers: Tiki Software Community Association and community volunteers
- Release: October 7, 2002; 23 years ago
- Stable release: 27.1 / 23 November 2024
- Written in: PHP
- Platform: Web application
- Available in: Multilingual (30)
- Type: Wiki software; Content Management System (CMS); Geospatial Content Management System (GeoCMS); Groupware; Online office suite
- License: LGPL-2.1-only
- Website: tiki.org
- Repository: gitlab.com/tikiwiki/tiki/

Tiki Wiki CMS Groupware or simply Tiki, originally known as TikiWiki, is a free and open source Wiki-based content management system and online office suite written primarily in PHP and distributed under the GNU Lesser General Public License (LGPL-2.1-only) license. In addition to enabling websites and portals on the internet and on intranets and extranets, Tiki contains a number of collaboration features allowing it to operate as a Geospatial Content Management System (GeoCMS) and Groupware web application.

Tiki includes all the basic features common to most CMSs such as the ability to register and maintain individual user accounts within a flexible and rich permission / privilege system, create and manage menus, RSS-feeds, customize page layout, perform logging, and administer the system. All administration tasks are accomplished through a browser-based user interface.

Tiki features an all-in-one design, as opposed to a core+extensions model followed by other CMSs. This allows for future-proof upgrades (since all features are released together), but has the drawback of an extremely large codebase (more than 1,000,000 lines).

Tiki can run on any computing platform that supports both a web server capable of running PHP 5 (including Apache HTTP Server, IIS, lighttpd, Hiawatha, Cherokee, and nginx) and a MySQL/MariaDB database to store content and settings.

== Major components ==
Tiki has four major categories of components: content creation and management tools, content organization tools and navigation aids, communication tools, and configuration and administration tools. These components enable administrators and users to create and manage content, as well as letting them communicate to others and configure sites.

In addition, Tiki allows each user to choose from various visual themes. These themes are implemented using CSS and the open source Smarty template engine. Additional themes can be created by a Tiki administrator for branding or customization as well.

== Internationalization ==
Tiki is an international project, supporting many languages. The default interface language in Tiki is English, but any language that can be encoded and displayed using the UTF-8 encoding can be supported. Translated strings can be included via an external language file, or by translating interface strings directly, through the database. As of 29 September 2005, Tiki had been fully translated into eight languages and reportedly 90% or more translated into another five languages, as well as partial translations for nine additional languages.

Tiki also supports interactive translation of actual wiki pages and was the initial wiki engine used in the Cross Lingual Wiki Engine Project. This allows Tiki-based web sites to have translated content — not just the user interface.

== Implementation ==
Tiki is developed primarily in PHP with some JavaScript code. It uses MySQL/MariaDB as a database. It will run on any server that provides PHP 5, including Apache and Microsoft's IIS.

Tiki components make extensive use of other open source projects, including Zend Framework, Smarty, jQuery, HTML Purifier, FCKeditor, Raphaël, phpCAS, and Morcego. When used with Mapserver Tiki can become a Geospatial Content Management System.

== Project team ==
Tiki is under active development by a large international community of over 300 developers and translators, and is one of the largest open-source teams in the world. Project members have donated the resources and bandwidth required to host the tiki.org website and various subdomains. The project members refer to this dependence on their own product as "eating their own dogfood", which they have been doing since the early days of the project. Tiki community members also participate in various related events such as WikiSym and the Libre Software Meeting.

== History ==
Tiki has been hosted on SourceForge.net since its initial release (Release 0.9, named Spica) in October 2002. It was primarily the development of Luis Argerich (Buenos Aires, Argentina), Eduardo Polidor (São Paulo, Brazil), and Garland Foster (Green Bay, WI, United States).

In July 2003, Tiki was named the SourceForge.net July 2003 Project of the Month. In late 2003, a fork of Tiki was used to create Bitweaver.

In 2006, Tiki was named to CMS Report's Top 30 Web Applications.

In 2008, Tiki was named to EContent magazine's Top 100

In 2009, Tiki adopted a six-month release cycle and announced the selection of a Long Term Support (LTS) version and the Tiki Software Community Association was formed as the legal steward for Tiki. The Tiki Software Association is a not-for-profit entity established in Canada. Previously, the entire project was run entirely by volunteers.

In 2010, Tiki received Best of Open Source Software Applications Award (BOSSIE) from InfoWorld, in the Applications category.

In 2011, Tiki was named to CMS Report's Top 30 Web Applications.

In 2012, Tiki was named "Best Web Tool" by WebHostingSearch.com, and "People's Choice: Best Free CMS" by CMS Critic.

In 2016, Tiki was named as one of the "10 Best Open Source Collaboration Software Tools" by Small Business Computing.

== Name ==
The name TikiWiki is written in CamelCase, a common Wiki syntax indicating a hyperlink within the Wiki. It is most likely a compound word combining two Polynesian terms, Tiki and Wiki, to create a self-rhyming name similar to wikiwiki, a common variant of wiki.

A backronym has also been formed for Tiki: Tightly Integrated Knowledge Infrastructure.

== Release Information and History ==
In general, the Tiki Software Community Association releases a new major version of Tiki Wiki every 8 months where prior, non-LTS, major versions are supported until the first minor version release of the next major version (i.e., 16.0 ⇒ 17.1). Starting with version 12.x, Tiki Wiki LTS is supported for 5 years where it enters a security/maintenance release cycle upon the release of the next LTS version. Tiki Wiki's release history is outlined below.

== See also ==
- Comparison of wiki software
- List of content management systems
- Comparison of office suites
- List of spreadsheet software
