= National States Geographic Information Council =

American organization

NSGIC Logo

The National States Geographic Information Council (NSGIC) is an organization in the United States of America of the states, the District of Columbia, and the territories that works to improve the use and sharing of geospatial data and GIS tools. The purpose of the organization is "to advance effective state-led geospatial coordination for the nation. NSGIC serves as a national forum to develop future-oriented geospatial leadership and advance sound policies and practices for geospatial activities."

== Membership ==
NSGIC members include state GIS coordinators and senior state GIS managers, representatives of federal agencies, local and county governments, the private sector, the academic sector, and other professional organizations. Among the NSGIC membership are experts, recognized nationally and internationally, in GIS, in IT policy, and in data creation and data management.

== Goals ==
NSGIC serves as a "national forum to develop future-oriented geospatial leadership and advance sound policies and practices for geospatial activities."

Among the major focus areas of NSGIC are:

- Support for The National Spatial Data Infrastructure (NSDI).
- Establishing well-planned, comprehensive, nation-scale "For the Nation" data initiatives such as Imagery for the Nation and Transportation for the Nation.
- Creating standards and a national approach to address location data.
- Bringing all fifty states, the District of Columbia, and the territories up to a common standard of GIS coordination.

== Meetings and communication ==
NSGIC members gather in person twice each year; once in early spring for a Mid-Year Meeting and once in the early fall for an Annual Conference. Mid-Year meetings are held in Annapolis, Maryland and include meetings with federal leaders on Capitol Hill. NSGIC Annual Conferences have been held since 1991 and rotate among the states.

The NSGIC Board of Directors meets monthly by conference call. Several standing committees and special workgroups meet by conference call monthly, or as needed.

The membership is kept informed via a NSGIC e-mail list, a NSGIC web site, and a NSGIC Blog.
