= Midgard (software) =

Persistent storage software

- The Midgard Project

- AJAX inline editing of content in Midgard
- Developer: The Midgard Community
- Stable release: 12.09.1 / September 26, 2012
- Operating system: Linux, Unix and Mac OS X
- Type: Content Management Framework
- License: LGPL
- Website: www.midgard-project.org

Midgard is an open source persistent storage framework. It provides an object-oriented and replicated environment for building data-intensive applications.

Midgard also ships with MidCOM content management system (CMS) built on the Midgard framework. MidCOM's features include web-based authoring WYSIWYG interfaces and a component interface for installing additional web functionalities, including wikis and blogs.

Midgard is built on the GNOME stack of libraries like GLib and libgda, and has language bindings for C, Python, Objective-C and PHP. Communications between applications written in the different languages happen over D-Bus. The CMS functionalities run on the LAMP (Linux, Apache, MySQL and PHP) platform. Midgard can also be used with PHPCR, the PHP implementation of the Java Content Repository standard. In early 2000s (decade) there was also a pure-PHP implementation of the Midgard API called Midgard Lite that has since been re-implemented as the midgard-portable project.

The project follows the synchronized, 6 month release cycle that is implemented by several major open source projects like Ubuntu and GNOME. Because of this, the version numbering reflects the year and month of a release. The version 8.09 Ragnaroek has been designated as a "Long Term Support" release.

Especially the templating and page composition features of Midgard have received praise, earning honorary mentions in several CMS Watch surveys. It also got score of 42 out of 45 in the Celebrity CMS Deathmatch of 2009

== Etymology ==
The name Midgard comes from Nordic mythology, meaning Middle earth, the world of humans. Most of the Midgard developer community comes from the Baltic region, and the project has been referred by CMS Watch as the Hanseatic League of Content Management.

== History ==
Midgard Project was started in early 1998 by Jukka Zitting and Henri Bergius for a Finnish historical reenactment organization —Harmaasudet— as a system for them to publish their material online.

Since the organization didn't have resources to maintain a large development project by itself, the open source model was chosen for creating a community of contributors to the system. The version 1.0 of Midgard was released to the public on May 8, 1999. It attracted a steady stream of users, and the development project flourished despite quite primitive early user interfaces.

Commercial services for the platform started to appear in early 2000. One of the first adopters was Envida, a Dutch company that realized the potential of Midgard for Web hosting purposes. First proprietary application for the platform was Hong Kong Linux Center (HKLC) Nadmin Studio content management system.

In early 2000s (decade), Midgard developers participated actively in OSCOM, the collaborative organization for open source content management systems. This included development of shared content editing clients like Twingle and tutorials in various conferences. Midgard also featured in F.U.D., the Wyona Pictures documentary about OSCOM.

First application not connected with content management was Nemein.Net, a Professional Services Automation application released in 2002 by Nemein, a Finnish Midgard company. In May 2004 the Nemein.Net suite was renamed to OpenPSA and released under Open Source licensing.

By 2009, some social web services, like Qaiku have also adopted Midgard as their content management platform. It also runs in organizations like Helsinki University of Technology and Maemo. e-commerce implementations with Midgard include the Movie-TV online video rental service. It has been used by New Zealand government for running the country's eGovernment portal.

Midgard has seen some non-Web use also, including providing synchronization with the Tomboy note-taking application for Linux desktop.

In addition to regular content management, Midgard is seeing use in special web application scenarios like Lufthansa's system for managing global marketing budgets and HP's client documentation system.

The Midgard content repository library entered the Debian distribution in November 2010. Some parts of the history of Midgard are recounted in the book Open Advice.

== Licensing ==
The Midgard core libraries and the MidCOM CMS are distributed under the GNU Lesser General Public License (LGPL), a license which permits the software to be freely used so long as it is dynamically linked or the user can relink it to new versions of the libraries. This is the same license used by the GNU C Library. This licensing scheme qualifies Midgard as free software developed with an open source model.

Official documentation is licensed under the Creative Commons Attribution-ShareAlike License which supports the free usage principles defined by the GPL for code.

Applications developed using the Midgard application programming interfaces (API) can be copyrighted and licensed under any terms by their authors, enabling creation of commercial products and services based on the platform.

== See also ==
- List of content management systems
- Geospatial Content Management System
