= Qaiku =

Micro-blogging and lifestreaming service

- Website type: micro-blogging and photo sharing
- Available in: English; Finnish
- Dissolved: October 15, 2012
- Owners: Rohea and Nemein
- Website: www.qaiku.com
- Commercial: Yes
- Launched: March 2009
- Current status: Defunct

Qaiku was a micro-blogging and lifestreaming service comparable to Twitter and Jaiku. It allowed users to post short text or picture messages that other users can then post comments on. In comparison to Twitter and Jaiku, Qaiku had a multilingual focus, with all messages marked and searchable based on their language. It was shut down on October 15, 2012.

== History ==
Qaiku was developed in winter 2009, by Rohea to provide an evolving replacement for the Jaiku service that had been seen as stagnating since it was bought by Google on October 9, 2007.

The website launched on March 9, to an initially Finnish audience. Later Finnish Midgard company Nemein joined the project.

On July 29, 2009, translation of the website to new languages was opened to external contributors to enhance the multilingual appeal of the site.

In September 2009, Qaiku team announced that there will be a version of Qaiku targeted at organizational microblogging provided as software as a service.

On October 7, 2009, Qaiku expanded with Italian and Polish versions.

On September 21, 2012, Qaiku announced that it would be shutting down on October 15, 2012, for a variety of reasons.

== Software ==
Qaiku was a website that has been built on top of the Midgard content management framework. It provides an optimized view for both desktop browsers and mobile browsers.

== See also ==
- Brightkite
- Identi.ca
- Jaiku
- Twitter
