= Digital Notam =

A Digital NOTAM (DIGITAM) is a data set made available through digital services containing information concerning the establishment, condition or change in any aeronautical facility, service, procedure or hazard, the timely knowledge of which is essential to systems and automated equipment used by personnel concerned with flight operations.

The Digital NOTAM encoding is based on the Aeronautical Information Exchange Model (AIXM) version 5, which has been developed in cooperation between the European Organisation for the Safety of Air Navigation (EUROCONTROL) and the United States Federal Aviation Administration (FAA), with the support of the international AIS community. The DIGITAM eliminates the free form text contained within a NOTAM and replaces the text with a series of structured facts, which obtain to the aeronautical entity concerned.

In 2012, the Federal Aviation Administration (FAA) successfully launched the first global digital NOTAM (Notice to Airmen) system to all airports and airplanes in the United States.
