= Olaf Østensen =

Norwegian civil servant (born 1950)

Olaf Magnus Østensen (born 1950) is a Norwegian civil servant. He works in the Norwegian Mapping and Cadastre Authority, where he is deputy director for NGIS.

Østensen is a trained mathematician and graduated in 1977 graduate of the University of Oslo.

Østensen is particularly known for his work with the organization and accessibility of map information and have made a particular effort establishment of standards for online information. Internationally, he is head of the Technical Committee 211 of the International Organization for Standardization, which has the task to work out international standards for geographic information. Østensen has also been head of the Norwegian Standards Council, which has proposed standards that apply to audio and video content on public sites.

The Royal Norwegian Court announced on 17 November 2009 that the King had appointed Østensen as a Knight First Class of the Order of St. Olav for socially beneficial work. It was further informed that the decision to award him was based on "[..] Østensens pioneering work related to national standardization work and the development of access to public information."
