= Geospatial content management system =

A geospatial content management system (GeoCMS) is a content management system where objects (users, images, articles, blogs..) can have a latitude, longitude position to be displayed on an online interactive map. In addition the online maps link to informational pages (wiki pages essentially) on the data represented. Some GeoCMS do also allow users to edit spatial data (points, lines, polygons on maps) as part of content objects. Spatial data can be published by GeoCMS as part of their contents or using standardized interfaces such as WMS or WFS.

A GeoCMS can have a map of registered users allowing to build communities geographically, by looking at users location. The help of wiki for describing geographical layers present a way to solve the problem of geographical metadata.

Since the advent of Google Maps and the publication of its API, numerous users have used online maps to illustrate their web pages. Google Maps is in itself not a GeoCMS but a building block for GeoCMS applications. Similarly Mapserver can also be used for creating GeoCMS.

Elebase has such features as full handling of text, multi-media and geo objects that extend beyond a point on a map to areas, paths and defined geo feature types.

== GeoCMS comparison ==
	Django	Drupal	Midgard	Plone	Tiki Wiki CMS Groupware	WordPress
Ability to store locations	Yes	Yes	Yes	Yes	Yes	Yes
Ability to edit points, lines and polygons	Yes	Yes	?	?	?	?
Number of locations per content item	?	Multiple	In/about/at	See specific plugin	1	1
Maps on content items	OpenLayers, OpenStreetMap, Leaflet, Google Maps	Google Maps, Yahoo Maps, MapBuilder, OpenLayers	?	See specific plugin	Mapserver or Google Maps	?
Syndication formats	?	GeoRSS, KML, GeoJSON	GeoRSS	See specific plugin	RSS for maps update	GeoRSS, KML
Geocoding	?	Yes	Yes (Yahoo, GeoNames)	See specific plugin	not yet	?
User location sources	?		Manual, SMS, Plazes, GeoRSS, ICBM, Fire Eagle	See specific plugin	customized maps	
Can utilize spatial database (like PostGIS)	Yes	Yes in 2.x dev branch of geofield	?	?	?	?
Geographic Features Styling	?	?	?	?	?	?
License	?	?	?	?	?	?
Required Platforms / Main Languages	Django (Python) MySQL, PostgreSQL, SQLite, Oracle Database	PHP, MySQL, PostgreSQL, SQLite	Midgard (PHP), MySQL, PostgreSQL, SQLite	Plone (Python), ZODB	LAMP (PHP)	LAMP
