= ISO 18245 =

ISO standard

ISO 18245 is an ISO standard concerning the assignment of merchant category codes (MCC) in retail financial services.

These are used to control usage of corporate credit cards. MCCs are assigned by merchant type (e.g. one for hotels, one for office supply stores, etc.), with each merchant being assigned an MCC by the bank. Corporations can then control which MCCs their employees may use their corporate cards at, and this is enforced through the authorization system.

They are four digits in length. For example, MCC 5967 represents "Inbound telemarketing merchants."

New MCCs can be applied for through TC68. They are generally reserved for merchant categories having at least $10 million annual revenue.
