= ISO 19114 =

Framework for the quality of digital geographic datasets

ISO 19114 Geographic information - Quality evaluation procedures provides a procedural framework for evaluating the quality of digital geographic datasets, consistent with the data quality principles defined in ISO 19113. It consists of three classes of conformance: one for quality evaluation, one for evaluating data quality and on for reporting quality information. It is an international standard developed by the International Organization for Standardization. This standard has been withdrawn and been revised by ISO 19157.

== See also ==
- ISO/TC 211

== Source document ==
- ISO 19114:2003
