= CISC Semiconductor =

Semiconductor manufacturer

CISC Semiconductor GmbH
- Type: Private
- Industry: Electronics, Wireless Communication,
- Founded: 1999
- Founder: Dr. Markus Pistauer
- Headquarters: Klagenfurt, Austria
- Number of locations: 3
- Key people: Dr. Markus Pistauer, CEO
- Products: Semiconductors, Automotive, RFID, NFC, Bluetooth, Testing
- Website: www.cisc.at

CISC Semiconductor GmbH, established in 1999, is a company with worldwide business operations providing customer-specific engineering services together with hard- and software-products in communication systems. Main markets served are automotive, semiconductor, wireless communication (RFID, NFC, BLE, 5G and 6G), contactless payment and the Internet of Things (IoT) in relation to energy management systems.

CISC products, combined with collaborative international R&D work resulting from over 100 international research projects and 600 customer-specific engineering projects are used in the areas of system development and integration, modeling, testing, verification and virtual prototyping.

CISC is a member of international standards bodies including AIM, CEN, ETSI, IEC, ISO, NFC Forum, and RAIN Alliance, as well as the INSIDE Industry Association and the Car Connectivity Consortium (CCC).

The main office is at the Lakeside Science & Technology Park in Klagenfurt, Austria, near the University of Klagenfurt. A branch office is located at the historic city center in Graz, Austria. In 2012, the company established CISC Semiconductor Corp. in Mountain View, California.

== History ==
- CISC Semiconductor Design+Consulting GmbH was founded in 1999 as an R&D focused and 100% privately owned business by CEO Dr. Markus Pistauer in Klagenfurt, Austria.
- Between 2000 and 2002 CISC was part of two international R&D <s: “High Quality Design in Deep Submicron Technology” and “Technology Driven Design and Test”.
- In 2002 CISC opened an R&D center in Graz, Austria with the purpose of enabling a closer cooperation with the Institute for Technical Informatics at Graz University of Technology.
- In 2003 CISC Semiconductor expanded its business towards radio frequency identification (RFID) and radio frequency (RF) communication, laying the foundation for its current activity in various standardization processes.
- Getting further into RFID technology, CISC became a member of EPCglobal™ and started participating in RFID standardization work for the first time in 2004.
- In 2004 CISC launched its product SyAD® (System Architect Designer) and won an Austrian Innovation and Research Prize Award (Province Carinthia).
- 2004 CISC has been organized into three business units: Automotive (AT), RFID+RFComm (RF) and Tools+Methodology (TM).
- CISC joined two European R&D projects: “Robust Design for Efficient Use of Nanometer Technologies” (ROBIN) and “Wireless Technologies for small area Networks with Embedded Security and Safety” (Witness), starting in 2004.
- In 2006 CISC won a special economy prize on high innovative products (by Privatstiftung Kärntner Sparkasse, Austria) for its RFID Application and System Design Toolset (CISC RFID ASD Kit+Library), which was brought to the market in the same year, as well as another RF product: The CISC RFID Field Recorder.
- From 2006 onwards, CISC started providing expert training on RFID via the European EPC Competence Center.
- In the year 2007 CISC launched products in all its three business units: AT (Automotive Bus System Lib and Automotive Core Lib), RF (Tag Emulator and MeETS), as well as TM (SyAD V2.0).
- Furthermore, in 2007 CISC and its products were present at four continents: Europe, Asia, Africa and America, further extending the company's export efforts.
- In 2007 CISC joined the Open SystemC initiative and became certified Alliance Partner of National Instruments.
- In January 2007 CISC moved its R&D branch to a new office in the historical center of Graz, Austria, near the "Stadtpark"
- Two new research projects were started in 2008: “SR2 – Short Range Radio” and “TEODACS – Test, Evaluation and Optimization of Dependable Automotive Communication Systems” at the Virtual Vehicle Competence Center. Another one followed in 2009: “e3car” via the ENIAC Joint Undertaking, which was meant to push the development of hybrid and electrical vehicles.
- In 2010 CISC pushed product development in the business units RF and TM, improving its product MeETS to achieve measurement sensitivities of UHF RFID tag performance measurements beyond -100dBm and releasing SyAD’s 3rd generation – SyAD 2010.
- From 2010 onwards, CISC Semiconductor is official industry partner of the Technical University of Munich joining their RFID AZM (RFID Anwenderzentrum).
- The international research project: “Process Oriented Electronic Control Units for Electric Vehicles Developed on a Multi-System Real-Time Embedded Platform” (POLLUX) under the umbrella of ARTEMIS Joint Undertaking started in 2010.
- In 2011 the company's name was changed to CISC Semiconductor GmbH, eliminating the phrase “Design+Consulting” to better fit the current field of business.

=== Global extension and recognition (2012–2015) ===
- 2012: CISC established its 100% subsidiary, CISC Semiconductor Corp., in Mountain View (CA), USA, to support its US and CAn based customers. In 2012 also the products RAIN RFID Xplorer and NFC Xplorer were launched, both high precision test instruments for Tag and Reader performance and conformance measurements for RAIN RFID and Near-field communication (NFC).
- 2013: Two new international research projects were started: FreeMoby on "People Centric Easy to Implement e-mobility" and eRamp to research on design methodologies on advanced semiconductor technologies ("more-than-moore").
- 2014: CISC celebrated its 15th anniversary and received the "Export Award of the Chamber of Commerce Carinthia (DE: "Exportpreis"). As a founding member CISC joint ECSEL Austria (now named as ESBS Austria).
- 2015: CISC participated in the "GoSiliconValley" initiative to broaden its business in US.

=== Innovation and ecosystem building (2016–2019) ===
- 2016: CISC became a founding shareholder of the Silicon Alps Cluster GmbH, a company supported by the Austrian government and regional governments of Carinthia and Styria, to strengthen the microelectronic sector in Austria and increase international visibility.
- In 2016, CISC became a member of the NFC Forum and the ARTEMIS Industry Association (now named as INSIDE Industry Association).
- From 2017 to 2019 a set of new national and international funded projects like Prystine, SECREDAS, iDEV4.0, Arrowhead Tools, STEVE, TrustVehicle and SCOTT were started.
- In 2018 the company COYERO, Inc, established in Palo Alto (CA), US, was acquired that was initially founded by CISCs CEO Dr. Markus Pistauer. As a follow-up, the European branch was founded in 2019 as COYERO GmbH at CISC's headquarters in Klagenfurt, Austria.
- 2019 CISC as a group restructured in four different business units: "Custom Engineering Solutions", "Wireless Identification", "Industrial IoT" and "COYERO" and reorganised itself based on a circular organisational structure. "Adding trust in a connected world" became the key message. In 2019 the Xplorer INLINE product line was announced with 1st customers producing RAIN RFID and NFC Inlays and tags and/or labels.
- Also in 2019, CISC received the Innovation and Research Award for the innovative digital service platform COYERO^{®}.

=== Recent developments (2020–present) ===
- 2020: Received the certificate "Family-Friendly Company" issued by the federal Ministry of Families and Youth of the Republic of Austria.
- Also in 2020, the series production of for production testing and encoding of RAIN RFID and NFC Inlays and tags and/or labels. This product was named products RAIN RFID Xplorer INLINE and NFC Xplorer INLINE.
- As a desktop solution for production ramp up the product CISC Reel-2-Reel Tester was introduced.
- 2021: CISC started to offer a set of products in the area of NFC Wireless Charging (NFC WLC). Aside engineering services as a Gold Partner from company NXP Semiconductors CISC provided NFC Forum compliant NFC WLC Development Platform and a NFC WLC Development Kit with a base station hardware and the sensor hardware and corresponding software libraries.
- 2022 CISC doubled office space at its headquarters in Klagenfurt, Austria.
- During the "GTM Tech Day" in September 2022 CISC showcased, as a 10+ years engineering partner, solutions for the "Generic Timer Module" (GTM) IP solution for chip manufacturers from Robert Bosch GmbH, Automotive Semiconductors division.
- In 2023 CISC focussed its business unit "Industrial IoT" activities on the energy market. The unit was renamed "Internet of Energy" as it targets to connect "Energy Variables" (Batteries, Photovolatic (PV)) for optimal energy use and to connect them to energy trading platforms. This was complemented by the acquisition of shares from company PIADENO Green Energy Management GmbH.
- 2025: Received the Innovation and Research Award the for its RFID test and encoding system "Xplorer INLINE". On the LabelExpo 2025 in Barcelona, CISC announced partnerships in the area of RFID production test and encoding with companies "Delta ModeTech", "Graphimecc" "Mühlbauer", "Rosas", "Tamarack".
- In 2025 CISC's NFC Xplorer Inline has been awarded at the 2025 IoT Star Awards and selected for the "China AIoT Industry Innovative Product List" by the World AIoT Innovation Alliance.
- End of 2025 Qualcomm and CISC announce joint forces of development of worlds first mobile processor with integrated UHF RFID based on CISC's product "RAIN RFID Xplorer LAB".
- 2026 CISC announces a new hardware platform for its Xplorer LAB product family with extended memory and support of latest air interface protocols.
