= Soterml =

SoTerML (Soil and Terrain Markup Language) is a XML-based markup language for storing and exchanging soil and terrain related data. SoTerML development is being done within The e-SoTer Platform. GEOSS plans a global Earth Observation System and, within this framework, the e-SOTER project addresses the felt need for a global soil and terrain database. The Centre for Geospatial Science (Currently Nottingham Geospatial Institute) at the University of Nottingham has initiated the development since January 2009. Further development and maintenance is currently handled in National Soil Resources Institute (NSRI) at Cranfield University, UK. The role of CGS is within the development of the e-SOTER dissemination platform, which is based on INSPIRE principles. The SoTerML development included:

1. Development of a data dictionary for nomenclatures and various data sources (data and metadata).

2. Development of an exchange format/procedures from the World Reference Base 2006.
