= RFID testing =

RFID is a wireless technology supported by many different vendors for tags (also called transponders or smart cards) and readers (also called interrogators or terminals). In order to ensure global operability of the products multiple test standards have been developed. Furthermore, standardization organizations like ETSI organize RFID Plugtests, where products from multiple vendors are tested against each other in order to ensure interoperability.

== Test standards ==
The most important test standards are:

- ISO/IEC 10373-6 for conformance to ISO/IEC 14443
- ISO/IEC 10373-7 for conformance to ISO/IEC 15693
- ISO/IEC 18047 multiple parts for conformance to ISO/IEC 18000 multiple parts
- ISO/IEC 18046 multiple parts for performance of ISO/IEC 18000 systems, interrogators and tags

== See also ==
- RFID Journal
