= Merchant category code =

Four-digit number listed for retail financial services

A merchant category code (MCC) is a four-digit number used for retail financial services to classify a business by the types of goods or services it provides. Codes are specified by the ISO 18245 standard.

== Assignment of codes ==
MCCs are assigned either by merchant type (e.g., one for hotels, one for office supply stores, etc.) or by merchant name (e.g., 3000 for United Airlines) and is assigned to a merchant by a credit card company when the business first starts accepting that card as a form of payment. The same business may code differently with different credit cards, and different sections or departments of a store may code differently.

== Uses of codes ==
An MCC reflects the primary category in which a merchant does business and may be used:

- to determine the interchange fee paid by the merchant, with riskier lines of business paying higher fees
- by credit card companies to offer cash back rewards or reward points for spending in specific categories
- by card networks to apply transaction-processing rules and restrictions (for example, Mastercard identifies Automated Fuel Dispenser transactions with MCC 5542 and applies specific preauthorization, transaction-completion, and clearing/reversal-processing requirements).
- for tax purposes, e.g., in the United States, to determine whether a payment is primarily for “services”, which needs to be reported by the payor to the Internal Revenue Service for tax purposes, or for “merchandise”, which does not

=== Limitations ===
Merchant category codes classify merchants according to the type of business, trade, or services supplied, and are intended to reflect a merchant's primary business rather than the individual goods or services purchased in a particular transaction. An MCC alone does not provide product-level or stock-keeping-unit (SKU) data. Where a merchant has more than one line of business and qualifies for more than one MCC, Visa's rules permit either use of the MCC corresponding to the line with the highest annual sales volume for all Visa sales or use of different MCCs for different lines of business.

== Code lookup tools ==
There are multiple resources credit card users can consult to predict how credit card purchases with given vendors may be categorized. Examples include:

- "Visa Merchant Data Standards Manual" (PDF).
- "List of MCC codes in CSV, ODS, XLS formats". github. 24 August 2022.
- "An ISO 18245 python library for MCCs". github. 6 July 2022.

== See also ==
- ISO 8583
- ISO 18245
- NAICS Code
- Standard Industrial Classification
