= ISO/TC 211 Geographic information/Geomatics =

Technical Committee 211 of the International Organization for Standardization (ISO)

ISO/TC 211 is a standard technical committee formed within ISO, tasked with covering the areas of digital geographic information (such as used by geographic information systems) and geomatics. It is responsible for preparation of a series of International Standards and Technical Specifications numbered in the series ISO 19100. The chair of the committee was Olaf Østensen (1994-2016), Christina Wasström (2017-2018), and Agneta Gren Engberg (2019-).

== Scope ==
ISO/TC 211 is concerned with the standardization in the field of digital geographic information. This work aims to establish a structured set of standards for information concerning objects or phenomena that are directly or indirectly associated with a location relative to the Earth.

Project specification areas within the ISO/TC 211 technical committee include:

- Simple Features access
- Coverages, including Datacubes
- Reference models
- Spatial and temporal schemas
- Location-based services
- Metadata
- Web feature and map services
- Classification systems

The ISO/TC 211 work is closely related to the efforts of the Open Geospatial Consortium. ISO/TC 211 have numerous liaisons with other organizations that often results in identical or nearly identical standards often being adopted by both organizations.

== Working Groups ==
The work within ISO/TC211 is done in working groups, each with a specific focus. The currently active working groups are:

- Working Group 1 - Framework and reference model
- Working Group 4 - Geospatial services
- Working Group 6 - Imagery
- Working Group 7 - Information communities
- Working Group 9 - Information management
- Working Group10 - Ubiquitous public access

There are also a number of disbanded Working Groups:

- Working Group 2 - Geospatial data models and operators
- Working Group 3 - Geospatial data administration
- Working Group 5 - Profiles and functional standards
- Working Group 8 - Location based services

Revision of standards that were previously part of these working groups are now done directly under the TC since the disbandment of the groups.

== Published standards ==
The list of standards by the ISO/TC 211 committee:

- ISO 6709:2008 Standard representation of geographic point location by coordinates
- ISO 19101:2002 Geographic information -- Reference model
- ISO/DIS 19101-1 ''Geographic information -- Reference model - Part 1: Fundamentals''
- ISO/TS 19101-2:2008 ''Geographic information -- Reference model -- Part 2: Imagery''
- ISO/TS 19103:2005 Geographic information -- Conceptual schema language
- ISO/TS 19104:2016 Geographic information -- Terminology
- ISO 19105:2000 Geographic information -- Conformance and testing
- ISO 19106:2004 Geographic information -- Profiles
- ISO 19107:2003 Geographic information -- Spatial schema
- ISO 19108:2002 Geographic information -- Temporal schema
- ISO/CD 19109 Geographic information -- Rules for application schema
- ISO 19109:2005 Geographic information -- Rules for application schema
- ISO 19110:2005 Geographic information -- Methodology for feature cataloguing
- ISO 19111:2007 Geographic information -- Spatial referencing by coordinates
- ISO 19111-2:2009 Geographic information -- Spatial referencing by coordinates -- Part 2: Extension for parametric values
- ISO 19112:2003 Geographic information -- Spatial referencing by geographic identifiers
- ISO 19113:2002 Geographic information -- Quality principles
- ISO 19114:2003 Geographic information -- Quality evaluation procedures
- ISO 19115:2003 Geographic information -- Metadata
- ISO/DIS 19115-1 Geographic information -- Metadata -- Part 1: Fundamentals
- ISO 19115-2:2009 Geographic information -- Metadata -- Part 2: Extensions for imagery and gridded data
- ISO 19116:2004 Geographic information -- Positioning services
- ISO 19117:2005 Geographic information -- Portrayal
- ISO 19118:2011 Geographic information -- Encoding
- ISO 19119:2011 Geographic information -- Services
- ISO/TR 19120:2001 Geographic information -- Functional standards
- ISO/TR 19121:2000 Geographic information -- Imagery and gridded data
- ISO/TR 19122:2004 Geographic information/Geomatics -- Qualification and certification of personnel
- ISO 19123-1:2023 Geographic information -- Schema for coverage geometry and functions -- Fundamentals
- ISO 19123-2:2019 Geographic information -- Schema for coverage geometry and functions -- Coverage Implementation Schema
- ISO 19123-3:2023 Geographic information -- Schema for coverage geometry and functions -- Coverage Processing Fundamentals
- ISO 19125-1:2004 Geographic information -- Simple feature access -- Part 1: Common architecture
- ISO 19125-2:2004 Geographic information -- Simple feature access -- Part 2: SQL option
- ISO 19126:2009 Geographic information -- Feature concept dictionaries and registers
- ISO/TS 19127:2005 Geographic information -- Geodetic codes and parameters
- [[Web Map Service|ISO 19128:2005 Geographic information -- Web map server interface]]
- ISO/TS 19129:2009 Geographic information -- Imagery, gridded and coverage data framework
- ISO/TS 19130:2010 Geographic information - Imagery sensor models for geopositioning
- ISO/DTS 19130-2 Geographic information -- Imagery sensor models for geopositioning -- Part 2: SAR, InSAR, Lidar and Sonar
- ISO 19131:2007 Geographic information -- Data product specifications
- ISO 19132:2007 Geographic information -- Location-based services -- Reference model
- ISO 19133:2005 Geographic information -- Location-based services -- Tracking and navigation
- ISO 19134:2007 Geographic information -- Location-based services -- Multimodal routing and navigation
- ISO 19135:2005 Geographic information -- Procedures for item registration
- ISO/TS 19135-2:2012 Geographic information - Procedures for item registration -- Part 2: XML schema implementation
- ISO 19136:2007 Geographic information -- Geography Markup Language (GML)
- ISO 19137:2007 Geographic information -- Core profile of the spatial schema
- ISO/TS 19138:2006 Geographic information -- Data quality measures
- ISO/TS 19139:2007 Geographic information -- Metadata -- XML schema implementation
- ISO/DTS 19139-2 Geographic Information -- Metadata -- XML Schema Implementation -- Part 2: Extensions for imagery and gridded data
- ISO 19141:2008 Geographic information -- Schema for moving features
- ISO 19142:2010 Geographic information -- Web Feature Service
- ISO 19143:2010 Geographic information -- Filter encoding
- ISO 19144-1:2009 Geographic information -- Classification systems -- Part 1: Classification system structure
- ISO 19144-2:2012 Geographic information - Classification systems -- Part 2: Land Cover Meta Language (LCML)
- ISO/DIS 19145 Geographic information -- Registry of representations of geographic point location
- ISO 19146:2010 Geographic information -- Cross-domain vocabularies
- ISO/CD 19147 Geographic information -- Location based services -- Transfer Nodes
- ISO 19148:2012 Geographic information -- Linear referencing
- ISO 19149:2011 Geographic information -- Rights expression language for geographic information -- GeoREL
- ISO/PRF TS 19150-1 Geographic information -- Ontology -- Part 1: Framework
- ISO/CD 19150-2 Geographic information -- Ontology -- Part 2: Rules for developing ontologies in the Web Ontology Language (OWL)
- ISO/FDIS 19152 Geographic information -- Land Administration Domain Model (LADM)
- ISO/DIS 19153 Geospatial Digital Rights Management Reference Model (GeoDRM RM)
- ISO/WD 19154 Geographic information -- Ubiquitous public access -- Reference model
- ISO 19155:2012 Geographic information -- Place Identifier (PI) architecture
- ISO 19156:2011 Geographic information -- Observations and measurements
- ISO 19156:2023 Geographic information -- Observations, measurements and samples
- ISO/DIS 19157 Geographic information -- Data quality
- ISO/TS 19158:2012 Geographic information—Quality assurance of data supply
- ISO/DTS 19159-1 Geographic information -- Calibration and validation of remote sensing imagery sensors and data -- Part 1: Optical sensors
- ISO/WD 19160-1 Addressing -- Part 1: Conceptual model
- ISO ISO 19170-1:2021 Geographic information — Discrete Global Grid Systems Specifications — Part 1: Core Reference System and Operations, and Equal Area Earth Reference System
