= Geographic data and information =

Data and information having an implicit or explicit association with a location

Geographic data and information is defined in the ISO/TC 211 series of standards as data and information having an implicit or explicit association with a location relative to Earth (a geographic location or geographic position). It is also called geospatial data and information, georeferenced data and information, as well as geodata and geoinformation.

Geographic data and information is stored in geographic databases and geographic information systems (GIS). There are many different formats of geodata, including vector files, raster files, web files, and multi-temporal data.

Spatial data or spatial information is a broader class of data whose geometry is relevant but it is not necessarily georeferenced, such as in computer-aided design (CAD), see geometric modeling.

== Fields of study ==
Geographic data and information are the subject of a number of overlapping fields of study, mainly:

- Geocomputation
  - Geographic information science and technology
- Geoinformatics
- Geomatics
- Geovisualization
- Mapping sciences
- Technical geography

"Geospatial technology" may refer to any of "geomatics", "geomatics", or "geographic information technology."

The above is in addition to other related fields, such as:

- Cartography
- Geodesy
- Geography
- Geostatistics
- Photogrammetry
- Remote sensing
- Spatial data analysis
- Surveying
- Topography
- Geospatial analysis
- Geospatial intelligence

== Industry ==
The geospatial industry comprises private companies, government organizations, non-profit organizations, and academic and research institutions that develop, manufacture, research and employ geospatial data and information.

== See also ==
- Earth observation data
- Geographic feature
- Geomatics engineering
- Georeferencing
- Ubiquitous geographic information
- Satellite imagery
