= Zspace =

Zspace may refer to:

- zSpace (company), a virtual reality hardware/software company
- Z Communications, a left-wing activist-oriented media group

== See also ==
- Z Space
