= TerraGo =

- Type: Private
- Founded: Atlanta, Georgia, USA (2005)
- Headquarters: Sterling, Virginia
- Website: www.terragotech.com

TerraGo is a private company based in Sterling, Virginia with offices in Atlanta, Georgia, and the UK that develops location intelligence, geospatial collaboration, GIS applications, and GPS data collection software. Founded in 2005, TerraGo is an In-Q-Tel portfolio company. In 2012, TerraGo acquired fellow In-Q-Tel portfolio company Geosemble. Aside from being an In-Q-Tel portfolio company, TerraGo is notable in part for pioneering the patented technology, related standards and best practices upon which GeoPDF and geospatial PDF are based, as well as programs related thereto.

== US National Map ==
TerraGo is the platform used by the USGS to deliver the US Topo Quadrangles over the web. The platform is based on a combination of software from multiple vendors, including Esri, TerraGo and others. The maps are delivered as GeoPDF products, which can be consumed by any PDF consuming software, including Adobe Reader.

== US Army Geospatial Center ==
The US Army Geospatial Center distributes a wide variety of products, including USGS topos, and a variety of National Geospatial-Intelligence Agency maps as GeoPDF maps. Raymond Caputo won the USGIF Geospatial Intelligence Achievement Award in 2008 for his work on the AGC's GeoPDF project, with the citation "This project has been instrumental in getting geospatial information out of the hands of GIS/mapping professionals and into the hands of anyone and everyone who can benefit from its use within the DoD and other sectors in and out of government."
