= Rebecca Bace =

American computer security expert

Becky Bace
- Born: Rebecca Gurley Bace; August 7, 1955; Leeds, Alabama, United States
- Died: March 14, 2017 (aged 61); Birmingham, Alabama, United States
- Education: Loyola University Maryland
- Employer(s): National Security Agency; Los Alamos National Laboratory; Infidel, Inc. In-Q-Tel; University of South Alabama
- Known for: Intrusion detection system "Den mother of computer security"
- Spouse: Paul Bace
- Children: 1 (deceased)
- Awards: NSA Distinguished Leadership Award

Rebecca "Becky" Gurley Bace (1955–2017) was an American computer security expert and pioneer in intrusion detection. She spent 12 years at the US National Security Agency where she created the Computer Misuse and Anomaly Detection (CMAD) research program. She was known as the "den mother of computer security". She was also influential in the early stages of intelligence community venture capital and was a major player in Silicon Valley investments in cyber security technology.

== Early life and education ==
Bace grew up in rural Alabama as one of seven children and was diagnosed with epilepsy in adolescence. Her mother was a war bride from Japan following World War II and her father was a self-educated teamster from Alabama. Due to prevailing attitudes about the illness and about women, her neurologist suggested that she stay home and collect disability following high school. She credited a local librarian and family friend, Bertha Nel Allen, for the encouragement to apply for college and scholarships. She won scholarships from charitable foundations set up by Betty Crocker and Jimmy Hoffa in her senior year of high school, and in 1973 she was accepted to the University of Alabama at Birmingham as the only woman in engineering. Because of financial hardship and frequent employment interruptions, she took eight years of classes at various schools to earn her degree. Bace first became interested in computing during her freshman year working with punch cards programming Fortran and COBOL on an IBM mainframe and got her first engineering job while teaching at an engineering lab. She was approached by a couple of Xerox technicians who needed to fill affirmative action requirements, and accepted a job as a specialist repairing copier machines. Of the experience she stated that she faced significant gender and racial bias, and that "sometimes customers would raise a ruckus for having to deal with [her] because they believed they had been given "second best" when [she] showed up, even though [she] was better educated than most of the men."

== Career ==
After graduation in 1984, Bace started working at the NSA, and while searching for a flexible job to allow her to care for her autistic son who was later diagnosed with leukemia, she took an assignment in 1989 in the National Computer Security Center. The NCSC was chartered as part of the NSA expressly to deal with computer security issues for the Department of Defense and the intelligence community. Bace served as program manager for intrusion detection research, specifically on transferring research into the relatively new commercial security products market. She played a pivotal role in the apprehension of Kevin Mitnick, proving that trace back and capture were possible beyond the theoretical context. She also provided some of the seed funding for computer security labs at UC Davis and Purdue University.

Following the death of her son, Bace went to serve as the deputy security officer at Los Alamos National Laboratory in the Computing, Information and Communications Division. She left Los Alamos in 1998 and started Infidel, Inc., a security consulting company. In 2002, she signed on as a venture capital consultant at Trident Capital in Silicon Valley. Bace also briefly served as Technical VP of the Cyber Security Practice for In-Q-Tel, the investment arm of the US Intelligence Community, and before her death she served as chief strategist for the Center for Forensics, Information Technology, and Security (CFITS) at the University of South Alabama. As a venture capitalist, she provided expert advice to a generation of security startups, including Qualys, Sygate, iRobot, Arxan Technologies, HyTrust, and Neohapsis.

== Legacy ==
Multiple awards have been established in Bace's memory including the Rebecca Bace Pioneer Award for Defensive Security and the Rebecca Gurley Bace SWSIS Scholarship.

== Books ==
- Bace, Rebecca Gurley (2000). Intrusion Detection. Indianapolis, IN: Macmillan Technical. ISBN 1-57870-185-6.
- Smith, Fred Chris; Bace, Rebecca Gurley (2003). A Guide to Forensic Testimony: The Art and Practice of Presenting Testimony as an Expert Technical Witness. Boston, MA: Addison-Wesley. ISBN 0-201-75279-4.

== External references ==
- Computer Security History Interview
- Podcast Interview
