= Traction TeamPage =

Commercial blog/wiki software platform

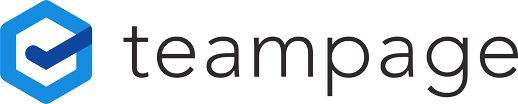
- Traction TeamPage logo
- Developer: Traction Software
- Stable release: 7.0 (23) / 2025-11-30[±]
- Written in: Java
- Operating system: Cross-platform
- Type: Blog, Wiki, Social media, Project management
- License: proprietary
- Website: tractionsoftware.com

Traction TeamPage is a proprietary enterprise 2.0 social software product developed by Traction Software Inc. of Providence, Rhode Island.

Traction release 1.0 shipped in 1999.

Traction TeamPage is a collaborative hypertext platform built to support working communication within and between groups. It is modeled on Douglas Engelbart's On-Line System (the first hypertext journaling system) and influenced by the work of other hypertext pioneers including Andy van Dam's Hypertext Editing System and Ted Nelson's Xanadu.

== Releases and features ==
The initial 1.0 Release of Traction TeamPage shipped in December 1999 and included features for web-based journaling, collaborative editing, and permission-based project workspaces.

Traction TeamPage is known for features including permission-filtered bi-directional linking, paragraph-level addressability, inline comment threads, and a journaling model that records time-stamped label changes as well as "wiki-style" content history. The platform includes a sophisticated permission model that aggregates multiple weblog/wiki spaces into a Front Page, e-mail newsletter, and search views.

With TeamPage Release 3.5 in March 2005, it became the first blog/wiki-type product with integrated WebDAV.

Traction TeamPage Release 3.7.2 first shipped in December 2006 with support for widgets, export-to-PDF or -WordML briefing books, and mobile skins. It also included wiki-style edit history views with a roll-back option plus an optional FAST Search module, providing automatic entity extraction and drill-down navigation as well as integrated attachment search.

Traction TeamPage Release 4.0 first shipped in June 2008 with support for moderation, page name history and management, and user profile pages. Moderation allows for typical publish and reject operations for comments but also makes it possible for authorized users to work in and fully experience the Draft version of the wiki or flip to the Published version to compare. Page Name management is the first to introduce page name history, the ability to alias page names across wiki projects, and the concept of a global page namespace from which names can be applied to any wiki project space.

Traction Software's Live Blog Micro-Messaging plug-in, announced in November 2008, is the first implementation of micro-blogging on an enterprise social software product. Live Blog interface can be deployed as an interface to a single workspace or across the server. It leveraged all the linking, tagging, threading, and permission controls available throughout the rest of the product. In TeamPage Release 5.0, the Live Blog interface evolved into a pervasive capability, present in each space and in a server Front Page roll-up which could display status posts from all users or those you are following.

Traction TeamPage Release 4.2, first shipped in November 2009, brought subscription features into the interface, introduced the ability to reply to comment on subscription notifications, added Table of Contents navigation from root articles for each space down to their child articles, and bundled the Metrics plug-in into the installed software. Subscription features allow for an easy subscription (via Jabber or Email) to a space, a user, a document, or a tag. Metrics reports provide an overview and detail on user read, author, edit, comment, tag, and search activity.

Traction TeamPage Release 5.0 first shipped in June 2010 with Traction's "Proteus" user interface based on Google Web Toolkit (GWT) technology along with integrated Twitter-like asymmetric follower model, integrated microblogging in each space, activity streams, extensible user profiles, incorporation of profile information into search, TeamPage Microsoft Outlook Social Connector, and other social networking extensions. Attivio (which is the name of the outsourced company used) replaced FAST Search as the provider of optional Traction TeamPage advanced search capabilities.

Traction TeamPage Release 5.1 first shipped on 14 Dec 2010 with action tracking integrated as part of Traction's social software platform. Release 5.1 also incorporates Attivio with Advanced Japanese Linguistics for Japanese language content analysis and faceted navigation as well as international search over mixed Latin, Cyrillic, Middle Eastern, and Asian language content

Traction TeamPage Release 5.2 first shipped on 10 May 2011, adding activity dashboards. Activity dashboards show consolidated status, actions, related documents, and discussion centered on any project or milestone, drawn from the flow of collaborative work. Reporter Ron Miller summarized this: "Using the project metaphor as the basis for understanding information in the corporate social stream, the idea is to give you a hook on which to hang the information."

Traction TeamPage 6.0 release first shipped 9 Apr 2014 with styling and performance updates for the Proteus skin; improved rich text editor; Jetty Web server to support session tracking, improved DDoS defense, compatibility with SPDY and WebSocket protocols; smaller memory footprint; redesigned setup interface; and security improvements including updated cryptographic algorithms including use of PBKDF2, and recording and optional login display of most recent failed and successful login attempts.

TeamPage Summer 2014 release New features include push notifications. Notifications focus on activity selected by each user using an article's Watch menu, or using automatic notification rules to watch actions on articles created, discussed, or mentioning that user. The in-page notifications menu expands to allow users to read, flag, or clear their notifications. Added password strength and revocation/expiration policy controls. Other changes include TeamPage SDK updates; and internationalization updates.

TeamPage Fall 2014 release New features include: support for @ style user "mentions"; updated popup profile card, profile page, and unified search to make @ user names more visible; interactive @ name auto-completion works in TeamPage articles, comments, and status posts; a new combo-box control for entry forms that supports type-ahead completion for spaces, projects, and milestones; moving entries between spaces. Other changes include TeamPage SDK updates; internationalization updates; performance improvements and bug fixes.

TeamPage Summer 2015 release adds two new interactive features: Live Task Lists and Presence. The list of Tasks shown in a shared Task view can now be reordered by drag and drop action to express the planned order of execution, rather than being limited to start date order. When a change is made, everyone viewing that Task List sees the same live update. Task views include a new Presence bar that shows the name and avatar of each person who is currently viewing the same Task. The release also introduces a new Bookmarks sidebar and improves Japanese language search hit highlighting.

TeamPage Fall 2015 release introduces Personal Worklists: Each person can track and share what they plan to work on, including their individual planned work on shared team projects. The release also includes the ability to edit, assign, close, or delete the current selected Task with a right-click action or keystroke; improvements to the Project Management, and List Management user interface; new Blank Slate guides to provide inline help and examples; bug fixes, SDK extensions, updated internationalization, and performance improvements.

TeamPage Winter 2015 release introduces Quality Management as a new TeamPage option. Quality Management extends TeamPage's content editing and action tracking capabilities to also handle Feedback, Non-Conformance, and Corrective Action tracking and reporting, based on the ISO 9001 process model. Quality Management also includes a new Signature Requirement capability that can collect signatures to approve documents and verify that documents have been read, or that a documented process has been followed. An electronic signature records the exact version signed, the date and time, who signed it, and the date when the document must be re-signed (for documents that have recurring signature requirements, e.g. annual review). The Signature Requirement capability includes reporting and reminder capabilities for upcoming or overdue signatures. The release also includes improved unified search, improved password management, new Developer SDK capabilities as well as bug fixes and performance improvements.

TeamPage Summer 2016 release introduces a new TeamPage mobile app for iPhone and iPad and an improved TeamPage Document Management user interface that includes the ability to move files and folders and add authored descriptions. The release also includes an improved Section Table widget used to embed summary reports in TeamPage articles; improved password management, and new Developer SDK capabilities as well as bug fixes and performance improvements.

TeamPage Winter 2016 release introduces a family of business process improvement solutions using TeamPage. These solutions were developed in partnership with Impi Business Process Solutions PTY, a South African firm. Impi! solutions use the ISO 9001:2015 model for defining, auditing, and improving core business processes with TeamPage as an integrated framework for documentation, communication, and action tracking. Each solution includes TeamPage templates, process outlines, forms, and guidance on how to introduce and adapt the solution to specific customer needs. Impi offers mentoring and expert ISO process assistance using Impi accounts on their client's TeamPage system. Impi can then use TeamPage to answer client questions, recognize problems or opportunities for improvement, track follow-up actions, respond to notifications, and make suggestions in the context of daily work. This is intended to make expert guidance more effective and affordable than a traditional consulting model. Other highlights include the new Daily Report and other plug-in extensions developed by Traction Software's Japanese business office, Traction SDK additions, and search engine integration improvements.

TeamPage 6.2 release is a major release that packages many improvements to the structure of the TeamPage code base that have been incrementally delivered to cloud-hosted and on-premises customers. Highlights include a new Quality Management Threat and Opportunity module, improved document relevance scoring for unified search, new plug-ins, and TeamPage SDK additions to support new discussion types, dynamic updates to form fields, and other capabilities.

TeamPage Winter 2017 Release integrates the open-source FullCalendar JavaScript library to add new calendar views, show Google Calendar events, and add extensible capabilities. Other highlights include a new Copy entry action, updated NTLM and Adobe Derby JDBC connectors, and improved type-ahead completion for unified search and external search engine integration improvements.

TeamPage Spring 2018 Release adds a new Question and Answer capability that can be used as either a standalone solution or as an embedded Q&A space to support other TeamPage solutions running on the same server. Other highlights include section editor improvements, caching improvements for large Journals, and integration of updated versions of the Google Web Toolkit (GWT) and Tiny MCE rich text editor libraries used by TeamPage.

TeamPage Summer 2018 Release adds ISO 9001:2015 Risk and Improvement Project management to the TeamPage / Impi! ISO 9001:2015 Quality Management solution. This replaces the earlier ISO 9001:2008 concept of Preventative Action. Risks are identified, analyzed, and scored within TeamPage, leading to related improvement projects tracked as part of the TeamPage solution. Other highlights include Japanese language and type-ahead search improvements.

TeamPage Winter 2019 Release focuses on performance, Quality Management, and improved interactive tables. The major performance improvements relate to query optimization and improved evaluation of search expressions to reduce query time and improve memory usage. Quality Management adds a new multi-standard capability enabling customers to add or edit a new Standard entry type to define fields that are specific to a selected ISO standard or internal activity and have TeamPage automatically add the corresponding fields to Quality Management forms when that specific Standard is selected. The release also improves TeamPage's integration of open-source DataTables from the JQuery JavaScript library. DataTables is packaged as a TeamPage widget used to embed interactive tables in TeamPage content. Other improvements include the ability to show Google Calendar events in TeamPage Calendar views.

TeamPage Summer 2019 Release adds new mailbox and messaging APIs to allow customization of support for standard email protocols and adds support for pluggable email extensions to handle unusual protocols. The release also improves search performance and packages new LinkBox widgets, Balloon widgets, and Questionnaire plug-ins. The Questionnaire plug-in now includes an answer tab used to show, organize, and export responses presented as an interactive data table.

TeamPage Winter 2020 Release switches to use the Amazon Corretto distribution of the OpenJava (OpenJDK) Java VM for TeamPage Cloud subscriptions. Corretto also becomes the Java VM option bundled with the TeamPage installer for on-premises use. The release includes improvements and bug fixes for TeamPage / Impi! ISO 9001:2015 Quality Management and business process improvement solutions. The TeamPage Developer SDK adds support for Client forms and Conditionals. General improvements include improved sign-off tracking and work-in-progress tracking performance along with over 130 general bug fixes and improvements.

TeamPage Summer 2020 Release switches to Apache Solr as the standard TeamPage faceted search engine for Cloud hosted and on premises TeamPage customers. TeamPage Solr is included with all TeamPage paid licenses and subscriptions at no extra cost. The release also makes improvements to the performance of project management-related queries used in TeamPage lists, views, and interactive data tables. The release fixes bugs and improves the cleanup of incoming emails posted to TeamPage directly or received as an email reply to an automatically generated TeamPage notification. SDK updates include changes to email processing and UserAgent API's. The release includes over 50 bug fixes and improvements.

TeamPage March 2021 Release introduces TeamPage support for Microsoft Azure AD Cloud. This enables a customer's Azure AD Cloud tenant to create and manage a unified directory of users and groups with single-sign-on access to cloud-based as well as on-premises resources including TeamPage. Groups and users defined by Azure AD Cloud can be used to grant or deny fine-grain TeamPage permissions. The release also includes an improved Impi! Project Dashboard with support for coaching and mentoring use cases and over 125 other bug fixes and improvements.

TeamPage December 2021 Release improves performance for TeamPage External Directory Integration with LDAP, Microsoft Active Directory, and Microsoft Azure AD identity management services. Includes Developer SDK additions and improvements for Forms, Ordered Lists, Proteus Events, and Proteus Widgets. Ordered List improvements relate to a new drag-and-drop Kanban user interface that Traction Software says it will release as a separate plug-in extension. The release includes over 60 bug fixes and improvements.

TeamPage September 2022 Release Introduces Kanban for TeamPage. TeamPage Kanban boards and colorful Kanban cards are used to visually plan and track activities. Kanban cards created within a board are visual markers, optionally linked to TeamPage tasks, schedules, and other objects. Kanban boards use columns (and optional swimlanes) to show the status of many cards. Status changes are recorded by dragging and dropping a card within its board. Kanban boards dynamically refresh to show changes made by other users. The release also includes over 89 other improvements, and bug fixes including external directory integration fixes, document view improvements, and security updates.

TeamPage August 2023 Release Includes Kerberos authentication, drag-and-drop permalinks, configurable Content Security and Cross-Origin Resource Sharing Policies, and security fixes. The release also consolidates Kanban improvements, improved mobile device layout, new supervised signatures, and support for Azure AD profile pictures as well as over 135 bug fixes and improvements packaged as point releases after the TeamPage September 2022 release.

== Analyst and reviewer statements ==
In July 2002, in an InfoWorld test center review of Traction TeamPage Release 2.8, Jon Udell of InfoWorld wrote "(Traction) can be best described as an enterprise Weblog system." This is the first use of the term "Enterprise Weblog" in the press.

Traction TeamPage has been recognized as InfoWorld's 2007 Technology of the Year award winner: Best Enterprise Wiki (see review), as well as a KMWorld magazine trend-setting product in 2005 and 2006. TeamPage is one of seven social software products reviewed by Clay Shirky in Esther Dyson's May 2003 edition of Release 1.0 (TeamPage subtitle "Weblogs Grow Up") and one of nine blogging platforms evaluated in depth by Forrester Research's 2006 Blogging Wave report. Traction TeamPage is also reviewed in Fuld & Company's 2006 Competitive Intelligence Software Report

In a March 2005 report titled "Blogs Wikis & Beyond," Burton Group Analyst Peter O'Kelly wrote: "Although Traction's products are marketed as 'enterprise weblog' offerings, they are powerful hypertext systems that exploit blog- and wiki-related advances to maximize simplicity but also do so on a scale that addresses elaborate hypertext application scenarios that would overwhelm wiki alternatives."

In an October 2008 Intranet Journal Review, about the challenge of balancing unstructured collaboration with the need for moderation and audit controls, Paula Gregorowicz claims "TeamPage 4.0 offers some breakthroughs to this challenge via its moderation model which is likely to impact the face of enterprise intranet architecture."

A December 2010 AppGap review of Traction TeamPage 5.1 wrote: "This is the action tracking part of project management for the regular employee, not the program management office. It brings this activity into the enterprise 2.0 world as every task is treated as an object for comments, RSS, and made searchable to those with the proper permissions."

A free Deloitte Center for the Edge study on measurable business value of social software includes an independent Deloitte case study of Traction TeamPage customer Alcoa Fastening Systems. Deloitte's press release and study cite "a 61 percent reduction in time required for compliance activities" attributed to the use of Traction TeamPage. The study includes quotes and data from Traction TeamPage customers Alcoa Fastening Systems and Ensign Bickford.

In his October 2011 Traction Software vendor review, Chess Media Group analyst Jacob Morgan said "Traction sees collaboration in the enterprise just like consumer-grade web services and applications, meaning when you type something into a search engine, you should be able to all the information you need and use that as a starting point to take next action. Think of a search engine that can index all of your content internally, regardless of what system it resides on, it can be on an ERP system a CRM system, or anything else. This searchability is what binds everything together."

In his October 2015 blog post, Real Story Group analyst Kashyap Kompella wrote: "Traction continues to punch above its weight. The company is finding interesting use cases for the TeamPage software, particularly in the ISO/quality management space for manufacturing customers."

== Funding and customers ==
In June 2002, a public In-Q-Tel customer agreement represented the first significant enterprise site license of a blogging platform. In-Q-Tel (the venture arm of the US Central Intelligence Agency) invested in Traction Software starting in May 2000.

In 2003, the US Department of Defense CIO office funded a Rapid Acquisition Incentive-Net Centricity (RAI-NC) pilot program, titled the "Liberty Project," to study the business case for using weblogs for net-centric project communication and information management. The study involved funding to add the WebDAV extension to the Traction platform and to support the following Liberty Project participants: Traction Software, The Office of Naval Research, the Army Night Vision Lab, Defense Acquisition University, Naval Underwater Warfare Center, Marine Corps, Ford Motor Company, and the New York City Police.

In 2005, Corante published the first detailed case study of an enterprise blog deployment. The case study, Dark Blogs Case Study 01 - A European Pharmaceutical Group, describes a CIO-led effort to deploy Traction TeamPage for a Competitive Intelligence function that spanned the organization.

In 2010, Traction TeamPage customer Borlaug Global Rust Initiative won a 2010 Forrester Groundswell award for the social impact of its use of collaboration technology to organize, conduct, publicize, and manage international research to combat a new crop disease that has the potential to devastate the world's food supplies.

Other public Traction TeamPage customers include Alcoa, Ensign Bickford, Kuka Systems, Enel (energy), Ipsen Pharmaceutical, Lucent, SITA, the Western States Information Network, a law enforcement agency funded by the US Department of Justice and the State of California, US Air Force.

== See also ==
- Collaboration software
- Comparison of project management software
- List of collaborative software
- List of project management software
- Project management software
