= Economy of Salt Lake City =

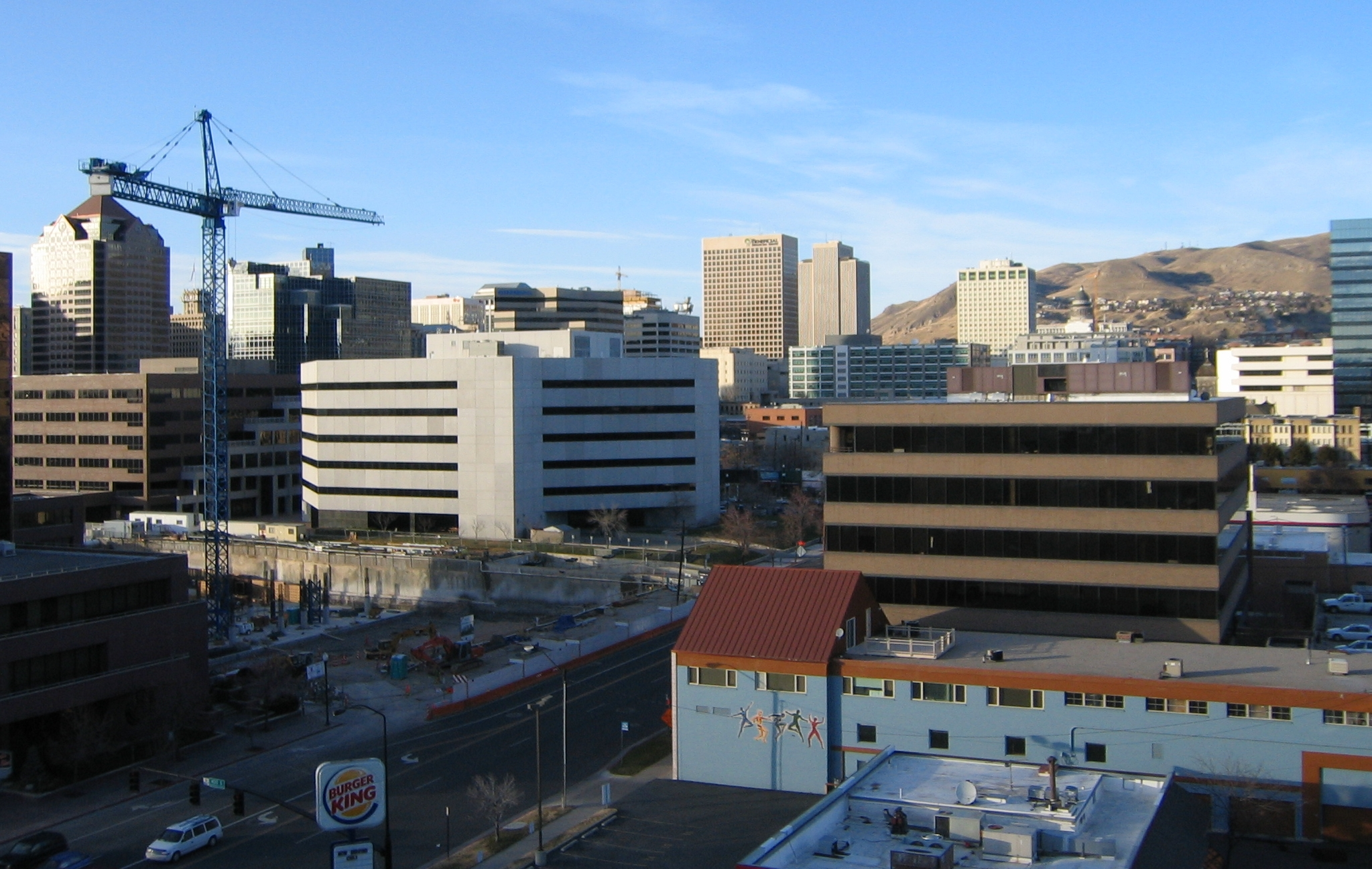
Part of Downtown Salt Lake 2005

The economy of Salt Lake City, Utah is primarily service-oriented. While nearby Bingham Canyon Mine (the world's largest open-pit mine) provided a strong source of income during the 19th century, the city has evolved to an economy built on transit hubs, call centers, and seasonal tourism. The 2002 Olympic Winter Games gave a great boost to the area's economy. Many hotels and restaurants were built for the 2002 Olympics, and although many survive, they have suffered post-Olympic market saturation.

== Companies ==
- Adobe
- Backcountry.com
- BloXR
- Bridge Investment Group
- Cisco
- DevMountain
- Guitar Center
- Intermountain Healthcare
- LexisNexis
- Lingotek
- Microsoft
- Nature's Sunshine
- NortonLifeLock
- Northrop Grumman
- Oracle
- Overstock.com
- Pluralsight
- Texas Instruments
- SanDisk
- SirsiDynix
- StubHub
- Sunrun

== Overview ==
Salt Lake City is also the largest industrial banking center in the United States. The city is known as the "Crossroads of the West" for its central geography in the Census defined western United States. Salt Lake is about an equal distance from Los Angeles, Denver, San Francisco, Portland, Phoenix, and Seattle. As a result, Interstate 15 is a major corridor for freight traffic and the area is host to many regional centers such as Dannon Yogurt and Sysco.

World War II brought many military and industrial jobs to the Salt Lake Valley. Hill Air Force Base was activated on November 7, 1940.

Local, state, and federal governments have their largest presence in Salt Lake City, accounting for 21% of employment. Trade, transportation, and utilities account for another 18% of employment, with the major employers being the regional Delta Air Lines hub at Salt Lake City International Airport. Equally significant are the professional and business services, which account for another 18% of employment. Health services and health educational services comprise an additional 10% of employment. Other major employers include the University of Utah, Sinclair Oil Corporation, and the Church of Jesus Christ of Latter-day Saints.

The Census estimates that the city's daytime population increases to 313,000 – the second largest increase for cities with at least 100,000 residents. This reflects the fact that a relatively small proportion of metropolitan area residents (18%) live within the city limits.

Rate of Unemployment*
Year	%
2003	6.7
2002	7.3
2001	5.0
2000	3.5
1999	4.0
*UDWS Info

== Economy sectors ==
=== GDP by industry ===
Salt Lake City Industries by GDP value added 2011

Industry	GDP value added $ billions 2011	% of total GDP
Finance and Insurance	10,419	14.58%
Real Estate and Rental Leasing	9,130	12.78%
Government	7,768	10.87%
Durable Good Manufacturing	6,056	8.48%
Retail Trade	4,599	6.44%
Healthcare and social assistance	3,567	4.99%
Construction	3,004	4.20%
Non-durable good manufacturing	2,884	4.04%
Transportation and Warehousing	2,600	3.64%
Information	2,399	3.36%
Administrative and Waste Management	2,240	3.13%
Other services, except Government	1,817	2.54%
Accommodation and Food Services	1,770	2.48%
Mining	1,062	1.49%
Arts, Entertainment and Recreation	625	0.87%
Educational Services	600	0.84%
Total	71,451	100%

=== Call centers ===
It is rumored that call centers prefer the Salt Lake City and Provo areas because of the mild western accent of Utah natives that is easily understood in all regions of the United States, and considered pleasant by many. Marriott Hotels, InterContinental Hotels Group, Delta Air Lines, Continental Airlines, and JetBlue Airways all have reservation call centers in Salt Lake City; Sprint also has a service center in the city.

=== Convention industry ===
A burgeoning convention industry has blossomed in recent years. A new convention center—the Salt Palace—as well as proximity to outdoor recreation has made Salt Lake City an ideal locale for conventions such as the annual Outdoor Retailers meeting. Recently the OIA, Outdoors Industry Association, presented Utah Governor, Gary Herbert, with an ultimatum: "Stop seeking to reverse the designation of Bears Ears National Monument in southeastern Utah" or [they] would take their trade show elsewhere. Herbert was unshaken by the OIA's threats and concluded the two would have to part ways. Said Herbert spokesman, "It shows how a political agenda, rather than reason or merit, seems to have captured the decision-making at the Outdoor Industry Association."

=== LDS Church ===
The LDS Church also provides a large percentage of jobs. Besides its central offices, the Church owns and operates a for-profit wing, Deseret Management Corporation (DMC). Subsidiaries include Bonneville International, which runs both KSL-TV and KSL AM as well as a number of other radio stations in and outside of Salt Lake City. DMC also owns the Deseret Morning News and Deseret Book. Smith's Food and Drug is based in the city, but is owned by national grocer Kroger. Other notable firms based near the city include Franklin-Covey in neighboring West Valley City, Overstock.com in nearby Cottonwood Heights, and Arctic Circle Restaurants (the inventor of fry sauce) in Midvale. Salt Lake City was once the headquarters of ZCMI, one of the first ever department stores, but it was sold to May Department Stores, which was later bought by Federated Department Stores. Former ZCMI stores now operate under the Macy's label (and did for a short time under the Meier & Frank label). Delta Air Lines operates its third-largest hub in Salt Lake City, and along with partner SkyWest Airlines is a major employer in the area.

=== Banking ===
Zions Bancorporation, a Fortune 1000 bank-holding company, has its headquarters in the city.

Since Utah is one of seven states that allow the establishment of commercially owned industrial banks, several industrial banks have legal headquarters in Salt Lake City; they include UBS, BMW, Merrill Lynch, and Target. Banks headquartered in nearby cities include American Express, General Electric, Ally Financial, Goldman Sachs, Morgan Stanley, Fidelity Investments, Sallie Mae, Volkswagen and Volvo. Walmart, Berkshire Hathaway, and Home Depot have applied for bank charters.

=== Technology ===
High-tech firms with a large presence in the city's suburbs include eBay, Unisys, Siebel, Iomega and 3M.

=== Potato production ===
In 2006 the largest potato producer in Idaho, the United Potato Growers of America, announced that it would re-locate its headquarters to Salt Lake City, citing its need for a large international airport, being that Salt Lake City International is the 18th busiest in the world in terms of combined freight and passengers. The announcement led some members of the Idaho legislature to propose legislation changing the state license plate, which currently reads "Famous Potatoes".

== Economic factors ==
Major factors that have affected economic activity within the city in the early 21st century have been the 2002 Winter Olympics, poverty, and urban sprawl. The 2002 Winter Olympics drove a need for many hotels and restaurants that have now led to market saturation. Urban sprawl has created fierce suburban economic competition resulting in inner-city economic decay. However, studies have shown that increased suburban growth has caused increased construction in the downtown area. By 2006, availability of Class A office space had fallen below 2% for the downtown area, which led to the construction of an eight-story, 230,000 sq. ft. unit for Fidelity Investments, located in The Gateway, and an additional 750,000 sq. ft. of custom office space for companies such as Myriad Genetics, Southern Nevada University and Spillman Technologies. A decade later, a Class A office tower of over 440,000 sq. ft. at 111 Main Street was planned for completion in late 2016, with an accompanying 2,500-seat theater and mixed use retail and boutique hotel on Regent Street.

Economic indicators in 2005 found that the city, particularly the downtown area, was experiencing increased population growth. The number of residential units in the central business district have increased by 80% since 1995, and is forecast to nearly double in the next decade. Recent sales of high-rise condominiums have been brisk. One 12-story building, The Parc condos at Gateway, had its ground-breaking in 2002 and was sold out in mid-2005; many new towers are planned within the next decade. One notably large development of over 1,000 units is being built by the LDS Church. This marks a turn in a half century's trend of stagnant population growth in the city contrasted with an average yearly growth rate of 6% in the surrounding suburban area.

== Employment ==
Employment by industry in Salt Lake City

Industry	Employment thousands March 2013	Percent of total employment
Trade, transportation and utilities	132.2	20.4%
Professional and business services	106.5	16.14%
Government	100.7	15.26%
Education and health services	71.8	10.88%
Leisure and hospitality	69.9	10.59%
Manufacturing	55.1	8.35%
Financial activities	50.6	7.67%
Mining, logging, and construction	37.2	5.64%
Other services	19.2	2.91%
Information	16.5	2.50%
Total	659.7	100%

== Fiscal Budget ==
Salt Lake City Proposed General Fund for the fiscal year 2012–2013

Revenue by Source	$ thousands	Percent of revenue
Property Taxes	63,110	30.66%
Sales & Use Taxes	50,795	24.68%
Other Revenue	19,713	9.57%
Licenses & Permits	18,664	9.07%
Fines & Forfeitures	11,341	5.51%
Intergovernmental Revenue	5,614	2.73%
Charges & Fees for Service	4,937	2.40%
Parking (Meter and bagging revenue)	3,255	1.58%
Total	205,817	100%

Expense	$ thousands 2011 fiscal year	Percent of expenses
Police	55,249	26.8%
Non-departmental	40,028	19.44%
Fire	33,658	16.35%
Public Services	32,321	15.7%
Community & Economic Development	16,958	8.24%
Attorney's Office	5,612	2.72%
Finance	5,579	2.71%
911 Communications Bureau	5,306	2.58%
Justice Courts	4,100	1.99%
Mayor's Office	2,612	1.27%
City Council	2,341	1.14%
Human Resources	2,048	1.00%
Total	205,817	100%
