= Name resolution =

Name resolution can refer to:

- Name resolution (computer systems), the retrieval of the underlying numeric values corresponding to named entities
- Name resolution (programming languages), the resolution of the tokens within program expressions to the intended program components
- Name resolution (semantics and text extraction), the determination of the specific person, actor, or object a particular use of a name refers to
