= Traction Software =

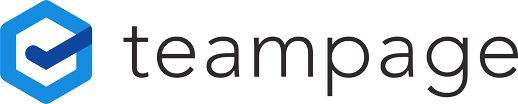
- Type: Private
- Industry: Software & Programming
- Founded: Providence, RI (1996)
- Headquarters: Providence, Rhode Island
- Key people: Gregory Lloyd and Christopher Nuzum, Co-founders
- Products: Traction TeamPage; TeamPage Cloud option Azure AD option Quality Management option Impi! Business Process Improvement solution
- Website: www.tractionsoftware.com

Traction Software, Inc. is a software company headquartered in Providence, RI. It is the creator of Traction TeamPage software for action tracking and collaboration. Traction Software products are used as project management software, quality management software, knowledge management software, competitive intelligence software, as well as other collaborative software applications.

== History ==
The company was founded in 1996 by Chris Nuzum and Gregory Lloyd who were heavily influenced by the work of Douglas Engelbart's On-Line System (the first hypertext journaling system) and other hypertext pioneers including Andy van Dam's HES and Ted Nelson's Xanadu.

The company was first to the Enterprise 2.0 software market with releases dating back to 1999 and a commercial market launch in 2002 when Traction TeamPage Version 2.8 was the first platform to be called an Enterprise Weblog in a review by Jon Udell of InfoWorld.

In 2003, the US Department of Defense CIO office funded a Rapid Acquisition Incentive-Net Centricity (RAI-NC) pilot program, titled the "Liberty Project," to study the business case for using social software for net-centric project communication and information management. The study involved funding to add the WebDAV extension to the Traction platform and to support the following Liberty Project participants: Traction Software, The Office of Naval Research, the Army Night Vision Lab, Defense Acquisition University, Naval Underwater Warfare Center, Marine Corps, Ford Motor Company, and the New York City Police.

Traction Software was named to KMWorld’s 100 Companies that Matter in Knowledge Management for nine consecutive years through 2013. In the Competitive Intelligence market, Traction TeamPage was included in Fuld & Company Intelligence Software Report in 2008/2009, 2006/2007, and 2004/2005.

== Funding ==
The company was initially funded by In-Q-Tel (the venture arm of the US Central Intelligence Agency) in May 2000. In-Q-Tel followed through in June 2002 with a customer agreement that represents the first significant enterprise site license of a blogging platform.

Traction Software raised a second round in 2002 with participation from In-Q-Tel, the Slater Fund, and private investors.

== Products ==
Traction Software's primary product is Traction TeamPage. TeamPage options include:

- TeamPage Cloud Option - Managed AWS TeamPage cloud instance includes daily backups, software updates, Solr search, AWS security and encryption.
- TeamPage Azure AD Cloud option - Microsoft Azure AD provides cloud-based identity and access management services to both cloud and on-premises resources
- TeamPage Quality Management Solution - Provides TeamPage based core Quality Management Documentation, Tracking, and Reporting services
