= Alex J. Mandl =

Austrian-American businessman

Alex J. Mandl (December 14, 1943 - March 25, 2022) was a notable Austrian-American businessman. He was the Executive Chairman of smart card giant Gemalto. He had been named "One of America's Most Powerful Businessmen" by Forbes magazine.

== Early life ==
Born in Austria, Mandl moved to the United States with his father Otto in the 1950s after his parents divorced. Alex attended Happy Valley School (now known as Besant Hill School of Happy Valley), where his father was the headmaster in the town of Ojai, California. After high school he attended Willamette University in Salem, Oregon, where his father took a teaching position. Alex Mandl received a degree in economics at the small liberal arts school. He then enrolled at the University of California, Berkeley where he earned a Masters in Business Administration in the late 1960s.

== Career ==
Mandl began working for Boise Cascade Corporation after college, remaining there for 11 years. He followed that by working at CSX Corporation and SeaLand. in the 1980s. Mandl began working at AT&T in August 1991 as chief financial officer. In that position, Joseph Nacchio was one of his top subordinates. Mandl was a key player in AT&T's purchase of a stake in McCaw Cellular in 1992. He left AT&T in 1996 to become CEO of Teligent, Inc.

== Positions held ==
- 1969 – Boise Cascade Corporation, mergers and acquisition analyst
- 1969 - 1980 – "various financial positions", according to his bio at Gemalto.
- 1980 – Seaboard Coast Line Industries, SVP and CFO.
- 1987 - 1991 – Chairman and CEO of SeaLand.
- 1991 - 1996 – CFO, then President & COO, AT&T.
- 1996 - 2001 – Chairman and CEO, Teligent.
- 1999 - 2002 – Board of Directors at In-Q-Tel (resigned to take position at Gemplus.)
- April 2001 - August 2002 – ASM Investments, principal.
- September 2002 - June 2006 – Gemplus International, CEO.
- June 2, 2006 – present – Gemalto, Executive Chairman.

== Other affiliations ==
- Board member of Dell, Haas School of Business, Willamette University, UC Berkeley, and the American Enterprise Institute. He has also previously served on the boards of AT+T, Pfizer and Warner-Lambert.
- Mandl has also been affiliated with General Semiconductor, Associated Communications, Omnisky, others.
