= Name resolution (semantics and text extraction) =

In semantics and text extraction, name resolution refers to the ability of text mining software to determine which actual person, actor, or object a particular use of a name refers to. It can also be referred to as entity resolution.

== Name resolution in simple text ==
For example, in the text mining field, software frequently needs to interpret the following text:

John gave Edward the book. He then stood up and called to John to come back into the room.

In these sentences, the software must determine whether the pronoun "he" refers to "John", or "Edward" from the first sentence. The software must also determine whether the "John" referred to in the second sentence is the same as the "John" in the first sentence, or a third person whose name also happens to be "John". Such examples apply to almost all languages, and not only English.

== Name resolution across documents ==
Frequently, this type of name resolution is also used across documents, for example to determine whether the "George Bush" referenced in an old newspaper article as President of the United States (George H. W. Bush) is the same person as the "George Bush" mentioned in a separate news article years later about a man who is running for President (George W. Bush.) Because many people may have the same name, analysts and software must take into account substantially more information than only a name to determine whether two identical references ("George Bush") actually refer to the same specific entity or person.

Name/entity resolution in text extraction and semantics is a notoriously difficult problem, in part because in many cases there is not sufficient information to make an accurate determination. Numerous partial solutions exist that rely on specific contextual clues found in the data, but there is no currently known general solution.

The problem is sometimes referred to as name disambiguation and, for digital libraries, author disambiguation.

For examples of software that might provide name resolution benefits, see also:

- AeroText
- AlchemyAPI
- Attensity
- Autonomy
- Basis Technology
- Dandelion API, providing a customizable approach for name resolution using an internal knowledge graph (built on Wikipedia, DBpedia and other sources)
- DBpedia Spotlight, providing a simple approach for name resolution using DBpedia and Wikipedia
- NetOwl

== See also ==
- Identity resolution
- Named entity recognition
- Naming collision
- Anaphor resolution
