= Platfora =

American data analytics company

- Industry: Big Data Analytics
- Founded: 1 June 2011
- Founder: Ben Werther (Executive Chairman)
- Headquarters: San Mateo, California,
- Key people: Jason Zintak (CEO); Ben Werther (Executive chairman)
- Number of employees: 125
- Parent: Workday, Inc.
- Website: Platfora.com

Platfora, Inc. is a big data analytics company based in San Mateo, California. The firm’s software works with the open-source software framework Apache Hadoop to assist with data analysis, data visualization, and sharing.

== History ==
Platfora was founded in 2011 by Ben Werther. Werther studied Computer Science at Stanford University. Prior to founding Platfora, he worked at There Inc., Siebel Systems, Microsoft, and Greenplum. In 2011, Werther met with former coworkers John Eshleman and Sri Satish Ambati in a café in downtown San Mateo, California. At one of these meetings, while discussing the technical process of big data analysis, Werther realized that he could develop software that paired with Hadoop to greatly speed up data analysis and visualization. Werther sought financing to start Platfora; Eshleman was initially an adviser, and later joined Platfora as founding vice president of technology. Ambati formed his own company, Oxdata (renamed H2O.ai). In 2012, Platfora acquired startup Plot.io for its browser-based data visualization technology.

Platfora received funding from Andreessen Horowitz, Battery Ventures, Sutter Hill Ventures, Tenaya Capital, Citi Ventures, Cisco, and In-Q-Tel, the venture fund of the Central Intelligence Agency. Series C funding was $38 million. As of April 2014, total funding stood at $65 million.

Platfora is one of several data analytics companies that industry analysts expect to compete with established firms including SAP, IBM, SAS, and Oracle.

On August 6, 2015, Platfora announced Jason Zintak as chief executive and Ben Werther executive chairman.

On December 8, 2015, Platfora announced $30 million of investment led by HSBC and Harmony Partners, alongside existing backers including Alleges Capital, Andreessen Horowitz, Battery Ventures, Citi Ventures, Cisco Systems, Sutter Hill Ventures and Tenaya Capital.

In July 2016 it was announced that Platfora was being acquired by Workday, Inc. Workday expected the transaction to close in the third fiscal quarter of 2016.

== Product ==
Platfora’s software works with the open-source software framework Apache Hadoop; when a user queries a database, the product delivers answers in real time via a graphical user interface. Bloomberg Businessweek called it “Big Data for Dummies.” A corporate or government data analyst can use the interface to filter results, or drag and drop fields to create graphs, overlays, and other visualizations of the data. The analyst can then share those data visualizations and answers with others.

== Marketing ==
CRN Magazine named Platfora’s in 2013. Platfora’s software was used at a festival in Kansas City to analyze the city’s crime data. Marketing firm Gartner named Platfora in 2015. A magazine mentioned Platfora in 2014.
