= Buzzinbees =

Buzzinbees SAS
- Industry: Telecommunication software
- Founded: 2009
- Founder: Jean-René Bouvier
- Fate: Acquired by Gemalto in December 2015
- Headquarters: Seyssinet-Pariset, and Sophia-Antipolis, France
- Products: Bee-SOON
- Number of employees: 40 (2015)
- Website: www.buzzinbees.com

Buzzinbees is a privately owned company that develops software and sells it to telecommunication equipment and software vendors. It is based in Seyssinet-Pariset near Grenoble in France. It was founded in 2009 by its current CEO Jean-René Bouvier. Buzzinbees's products are currently active in more than 135 countries worldwide. In December 2015, Gemalto acquired Buzzinbees for an undisclosed amount. Olivier Piou stated that the acquisition was motivated by Buzzinbees activation solution, especially for machine to machine.

== History ==
Buzzinbees was created by Hewlett-Packard senior executives in October 2009. A strategic licensing agreement with the IT giant allows Buzzinbees to continue to develop and enhance products that have been deployed for more than 20 years by HP (it is acknowledged that HP started to provide telecommunication operators and equipment providers with carrier-grade signaling as soon as 1988).

HP has become one of Buzzinbees's customers, buying signaling platforms as well as other products to embed them into its telecommunication solutions.

In February 2010, Buzzinbees announced its collaboration with PT on a messaging server: Bee-IRON. The Bee-IRON platform is a flagship product from Buzzinbees which can deliver and route 2,500 SMS per second in a single node. It complements PT's MicroTCA server.

In May 2010, Buzzinbees focused its attention on automatic SIM activation, targeting fast growing markets such as African, Asian and Latin American operators. This effort became visible at the 2012 next generation telecom summit in Nairobi.

Buzzinbees's name was inspired by the highly social communicating bees. Indeed, bees do communicate in order to recruit other worker bees to forage in the same area they found flowers. The Buzzinbees logo — pictured left — "sports a hexagonal cell" reminiscent of "honeycombs but also cellular networks" as well as 3 pairs of bee "antennas".

In November 2015, Buzzinbees's CEO created another company, Facts Haven SAS with a new logo. Following the Gemalto acquisition, his LinkedIn profile indicates that he no longer works for Buzzinbees. However, the Buzzinbees company still exists as a legal entity.

== Products ==
Buzzinbees's portfolio encompasses network nodes built atop a suite of signaling products providing development platforms based on global telecommunication standards and protocols.

These products work indeed with SS7 (signaling system #7), IMS (IP multimedia subsystem) and LTE (long term evolution) protocols. They augment networks with intelligent functions (intelligent network).

Buzzinbees's distribution channel is very specific: it sells to independent software vendors and equipment providers, as opposed to selling directly to operators.

Since 2011, Buzzinbees openly focused on automatic SIM activation and the nascent machine to machine market, pushing their Bee-SOON (SIM on-off node) product. Following the Gemalto acquisition, it introduced the concept of SIM reactivation whereby operators can let users reuse expired SIM cards instead of purchasing new ones when they wish to re-subscribe to that operator.
