= CallMiner =

US-based software company

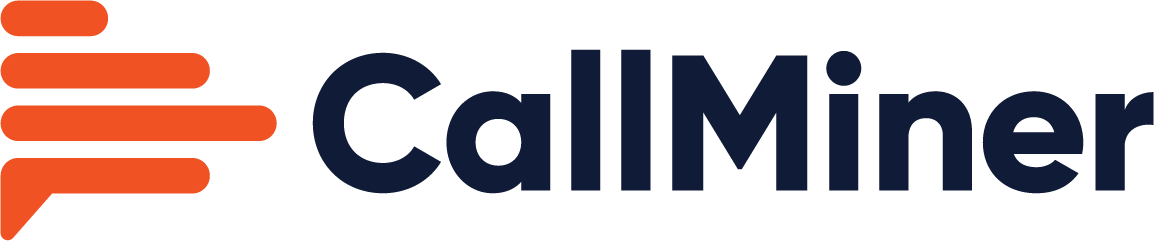
- Type: Private
- Industry: Software
- Founded: 2002
- Headquarters: Waltham, Massachusetts
- Key people: Jeff Gallino, Founder and CEO; Jonathan Ranger, Chief Customer Officer; Robert Lane, CFO; Ben Miele, Chief Revenue Officer
- Products: Speech Analytics; Virtual Agents; Customer experience automation
- Number of employees: 267 (2021)
- Website: callminer.com

CallMiner is a Massachusetts-based customer experience (CX) automation software company. Founded in 2002, it is headquartered in Waltham, Massachusetts with offices in the United Kingdom and Prague.

CallMiner develops software that uses artificial intelligence to analyze conversations between businesses and their customers. These interactions may be voice-based and occur over the phone, or text-based and occur over digital channels such as online reviews, chat, surveys, email, social media messaging, and more. Organizations use the resulting insights to improve automation, operational efficiency, and agent performance.

== History ==
CallMiner was founded in 2002 by Jeff Gallino, Cliff LaCoursiere and Kim Brown. The company develops technology for Customer service and call centers with a focus on improving contact center performance, customer experience, monitoring human and AI agents, automated quality assurance, and gathering key business intelligence. Analysis and automation of contacts across companies’ communication channels enhance accuracy and performance, and deliver better customer outcomes. CallMiner has raised multiple rounds of funding from investors such as NewSpring Capital and In-Q-Tel, including a $75 million investment from Goldman Sachs in 2019.

CallMiner’s Eureka platform uses artificial intelligence to analyze customer interactions to identify insights and to automate various contact center workflows. The company’s agentic AI framework, CallMiner AI Assist, was added to the platform in 2024. In 2025, CallMiner added Outreach, an AI-based survey and customer feedback platform, to Eureka.

CallMiner acquired call recording software company OrecX in 2021, expanding its native call recording and transcription capabilities. In June 2025, CallMiner acquired AI voicebot company VOCALLS, adding native conversational AI and interaction automation, and real-language translation via LiveTranslate to its platform.

CallMiner collaborates and integrates with a range of contact center and technology providers, including Microsoft Azure Cognitive Services and Zoom, announced in 2023. These partnerships support the integration of CallMiner's automation and conversation intelligence into other major business platforms. CallMiner also has an app marketplace for product extensions and partner apps and services.
