= Axalto =

- Company type: Public
- Industry: Smart Card
- Founded: 2004 (IPO)
- Headquarters: Paris, France; Beijing, China; Singapore
- Key people: Olivier Piou (CEO)
- Products: Smart Cards
- Revenue: $ 992 million (2005)
- Number of employees: 4,500
- Website: axalto.com at the Wayback Machine (archived 2005-09-24)

See Gemalto for current company information.

Axalto was a smart card manufacturer, that during its brief independent existence, with over 4,500 employees in 60 countries, was one of the world's leading providers of microprocessor cards (Gartner, 2005) and also a major supplier of point of sale terminals.

Axalto's business covered the telecommunications, public telephony, finance, retail, transport, entertainment, healthcare, personal identification, information technology and public sector markets. The company recorded sales of over $992 million in 2005 and was fully listed on Euronext, the pan-European market.

== History ==
Starting business as the Smart Card and Terminal Department of Schlumberger, after Schlumberger purchased Sema Group, it was merged with the latter to form SchlumbergerSema. When Schlumberger sold the IT services business of SchlumbergerSema to Atos Origin, the Smart Card and Terminal Department was again spun off to become Axalto, which went public in 2004, with its initial public offering.On December 7, 2005, Axalto announced its merger plan with main competitor Gemplus International. On May 19, 2006, the European Commission approved the merger between Axalto and Gemplus, leading to the creation of the new company Gemalto, on June 2, 2006.
