= Tacit Software =

- Type: Private
- Industry: computer software
- Founded: 1997
- Headquarters: Palo Alto, California, U.S.
- Key people: David Gilmour, Founder and CEO
- Products: KnowledgeMail, ActiveNet, illumio
- Number of employees: 30 (2007)
- Website: www.tacit.com

Tacit Software was a company that provided expertise and knowledge search software for enterprises and consumers. It was acquired by Oracle Corp in November 2008, and its assets were rolled into the Oracle Beehive collaboration platform.

Tacit was founded in 1997 as Tacit Knowledge Systems by David Gilmour, the founder of Giga Information Group (now owned by Forrester Research) and was headquartered in Palo Alto, CA.

The company was funded by Draper Fisher Jurvetson (Steve Jurvetson was a company director), Woodside Fund, Alta Partners and the Royal Bank of Canada (RBC). In-Q-Tel was also an early investor in the company. The firm was acquired by Oracle in November 2008.

== Company history ==
Tacit’s first product, KnowledgeMail, was released in late 1999. KnowledgeMail was an expertise location system that automatically read email and other documents to form profiles of user interests and expertise.

In 2003, Tacit introduced ActiveNet, a browser-based version of KnowledgeMail. In 2003–2004, several companies trialed ActiveNet and Tacit’s underlying technologies, including GlaxoSmithKline, Northrop Grumman and Lockheed Martin. Lockheed Martin, for example, piloted Tacit over five other expertise location vendors and later rolled the product out in its Space Systems Division. Ron Remy, the Deputy CIO for Space Systems, said, “We had a beryllium-welding problem solved by linking up two people who worked down the hall from each other, and they didn't realize that one had the answer the other one needed to solve this very serious technical problem that was holding up the entire project. We deemed the pilot to be very successful.”

In 2006, Tacit introduced a new product called illumio. illumio made Tacit’s expertise location technology available to everyday Internet users.

Tacit was acquired by Oracle in 2008 for an alleged 10M US. Oracle shut down the product in 2010.

== Intellectual property ==
Tacit holds 13 patents. These patents pertain to the following:

- Creation of user profiles with public and private components
- Assigning confidence levels to topics as they relate to users
- Methodologies for accessing user profile information
