= ZSpace (company) =

American technology firm

zSpace, Inc.
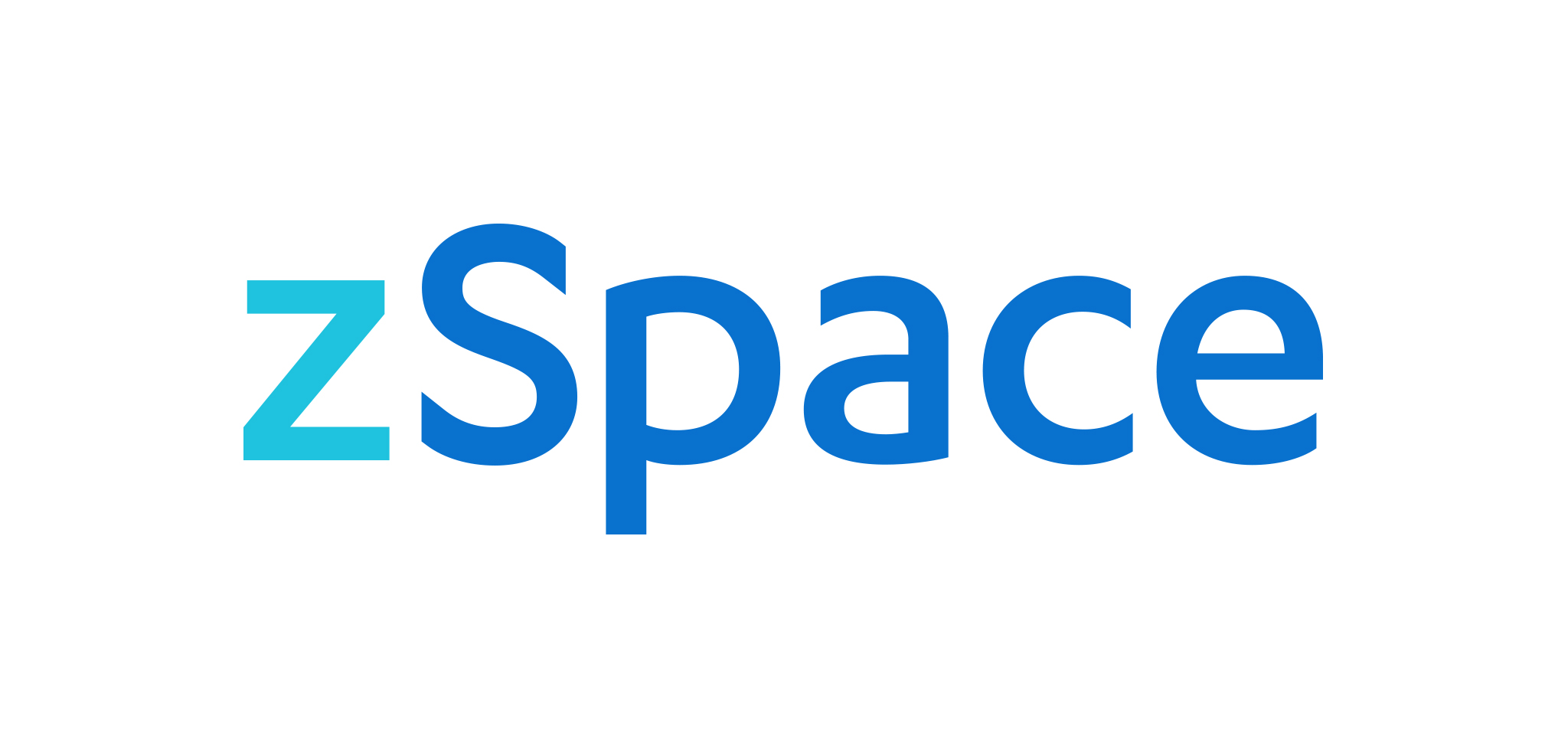
- Type: Public
- Traded as: Nasdaq: ZSPC
- Industry: 3D display
- Founded: 2007; 19 years ago
- Headquarters: San Jose, California
- Key people: Paul Kellenberger, CEO; Mike Harper, CMO
- Website: zspace.com

zSpace, Inc. is an American technology firm based in San Jose, California that delivers virtual and augmented reality experiences in STEM, CTE, and career readiness programs from a computer. zSpace mostly provides AR/VR technology to the education market, allowing teachers and learners to interact with simulated objects in virtual environments.

zSpace does not require the use of a head-mounted display. Users experience 3D content through a 3D computer screen, aided by head-tracking technology and a stylus. The hardware switches between the left and right images through a circularly polarized light that enters the eye. In legacy models, eyewear contains small reflective tabs that the computer uses to track where users are looking. New models are equipped with head tracking technology and do not require any glasses or eyewear.

As of June 2022, Paul Kellenberger is the company's current CEO and president.

== History ==
zSpace was founded as Infinite Z in 2007. Infinite Z's virtual-holographic platform was created with backing from the Central Intelligence Agency's In-Q-Tel fund, which invests in technology startups. Infinite Z formally changed its name to zSpace in 2013.

In November 2012, zSpace released an independent software development kit.

In the same year, zSpace collaborated with researchers at the University of Tokyo to develop a high-speed gesture tracking system. The technology is used in hospitals by surgeons before procedures.

In 2014, zSpace collaborated with NASA to be tested as an interface technology for future robots, using the program to interact with simulated objects in virtual environments using imaging displays.

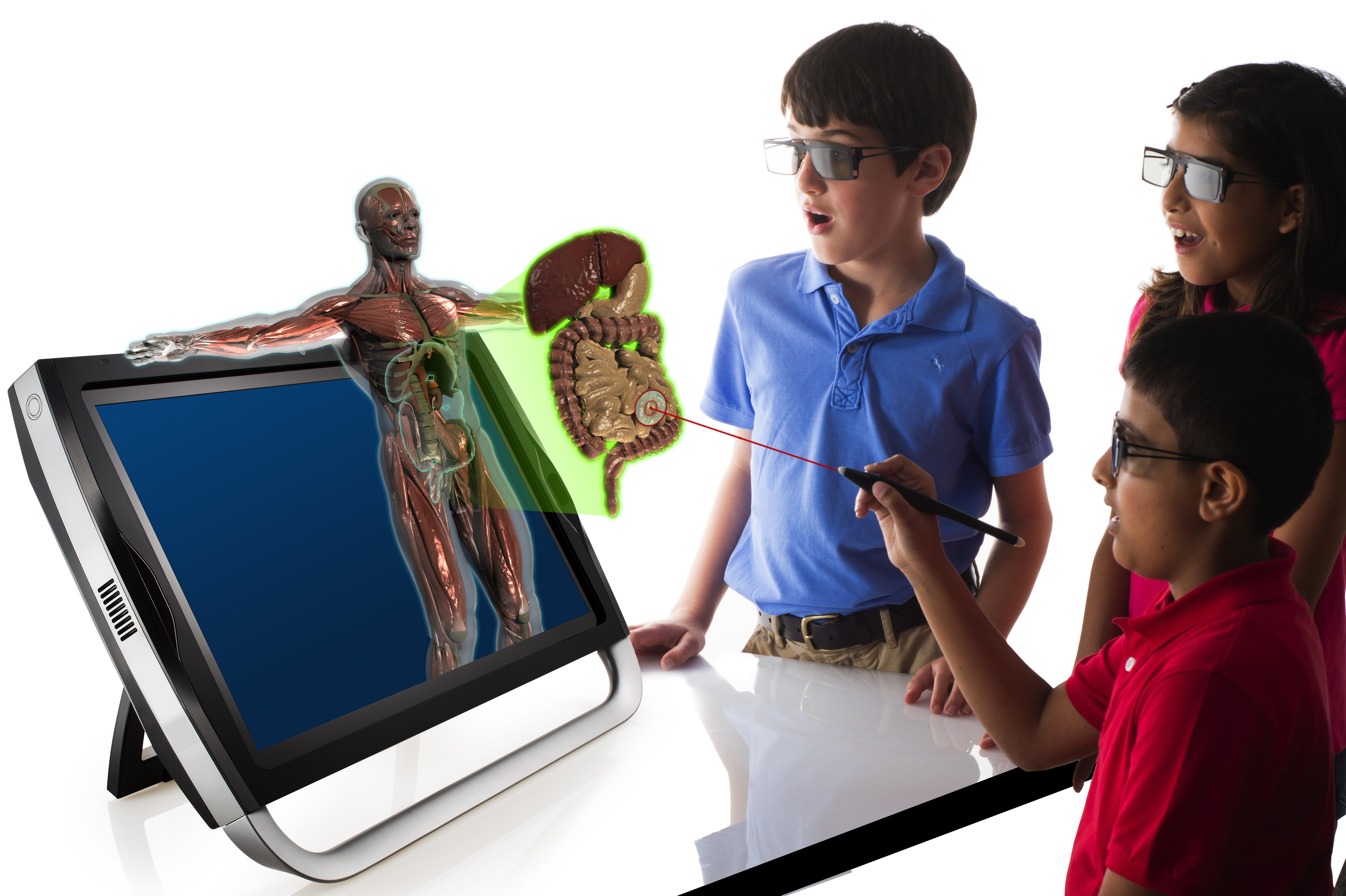
zSpace All-in-One for Education

Although the initial target markets for zSpace were enterprise-based, company employees and customers began to recognize the potential for zSpace in education, including K-12, higher education and career and technical education (CTE).

In September 2015, zSpace announced a partnership with Leopoly, a 3D content provider and modelling platform, to create an application that enabled users to create and customize digital objects for 3D printing. That same year, the company released an updated version of its desktop all-in-one system, zSpace for Education. The new platform allowed users to manipulate an array of virtual, 3D objects including building circuitry and experimenting with gravity. The release included approximately 250 STEAM (science, technology, art and math) lesson plans aligned to the Common Core, Next Generation Science Standards (NGSS) and other state standards for K-12 education.

In January 2016, zSpace released a VR web browser it developed in partnership with Google Chrome's WebGL team. zSpace and GeoGebra announced the release of VR Math in February 2016 with subjects like geometry, algebra, spreadsheets, graphing, statistics and calculus. At the ISTE conference in June 2016, zSpace announced Human Anatomy Atlas content in partnership with Visible Body. The company also announced that it had partnered with Google to combine zSpace's VR technology with the Google Expeditions Pioneer Program. Beginning that same year, zSpace demonstrated its technology to schools across the country via its Mobile Classroom Tour. The tour allows K-12 students around the country to engage with the company's STEAM applications in a lab setting and experience a variety of different simulations.

The company partnered with Shenzhen GTA Education Tech Ltd., and Mimbus in 2017 on automotive training and welding applications. In 2018, zSpace announced integration with Autodesk Tinkercad as well as a partnership with Merriam-Webster's online dictionary.

At ISTE 2018, zSpace released its first Windows 10 laptop for schools. In 2019, zSpace added Career and Technical Education (CTE) to its roster of applications, which prepares students for certifications and supplementary trainings through VR learning.

In 2022, zSpace announced a merger with EdtechX Holdings Acquisition Corporation II (Nasdaq: EDTXU, EDTX, and EDTXW) (“EdtechX II”), an edtech-focused SPAC. As a result of the merger, the combined company is expected to be named zSpace Technologies, Inc. and listed on the Nasdaq Stock Market under the new ticker symbol ZSPX.

In December 2024, the company went public via an initial public offering on the Nasdaq under the ticker symbol "ZSPC".

In March 2025, zSpace acquired Blockscad, a browser-based 3D design and coding platform used in K–12 STEM education. The integration is intended to expand zSpace’s offerings in computer science and design thinking curricula.

In April 2025, zSpace announced the acquisition of Second Avenue Learning, a company that develops interactive digital content for education. This acquisition supports the company’s development of standards-aligned content for AR/VR instruction.

== Product ==
=== Hardware ===
In January 2025, zSpace Introduced the Imagine AR/VR laptop. The Imagine was developed specifically for elementary-level education. It offers a simplified user experience and lightweight design, and integrates with interactive educational software and standards-aligned content.

In December 2024, zSpace introduced the Inspire 2 and Inspire 2 Pro. The Inspire 2 Series is an updated version of the Inspire platform, featuring performance enhancements and increased portability. Like earlier models, Inspire 2 supports AR/VR learning without requiring a headset or glasses and includes face-tracking technology and a haptic stylus.

zSpace's original Inspire and Inspire Pro were launched in January 2022 which allows users to experience AR/VR without a head-mounted display (HMD) or glasses. The system includes integrated face-tracking technology, a haptic-feedback stylus, and a stylus sensor module, which tracks the position of the stylus to create the AR/VR experience. It runs on a Windows 11 Operating System with a 15.6-inch, Ultra HD 3840 x 2160 pixel display, a NVIDIA GeForce RTX graphics card, and face-tracking cameras.

The AIO (All-in-One) and AIO Pro, launched in 2015, was geared towards users running performance-heavy applications, such as software developers, designers and CTE students and professionals. The AIO includes a haptic-feedback stylus and eyewear which is tracked by technology built into the display. The system has a 24-inch display, runs on Windows 10 and has an Intel i3 or i7 processor.

The zSpace Laptop used the same basic technology of the AIO products, requiring specialized eyewear and the haptic-feedback stylus. The processor was an AMD 7th generation APU that combines the CPU cache and discrete class Radeon GPU on the same chip die.

== Recognition ==
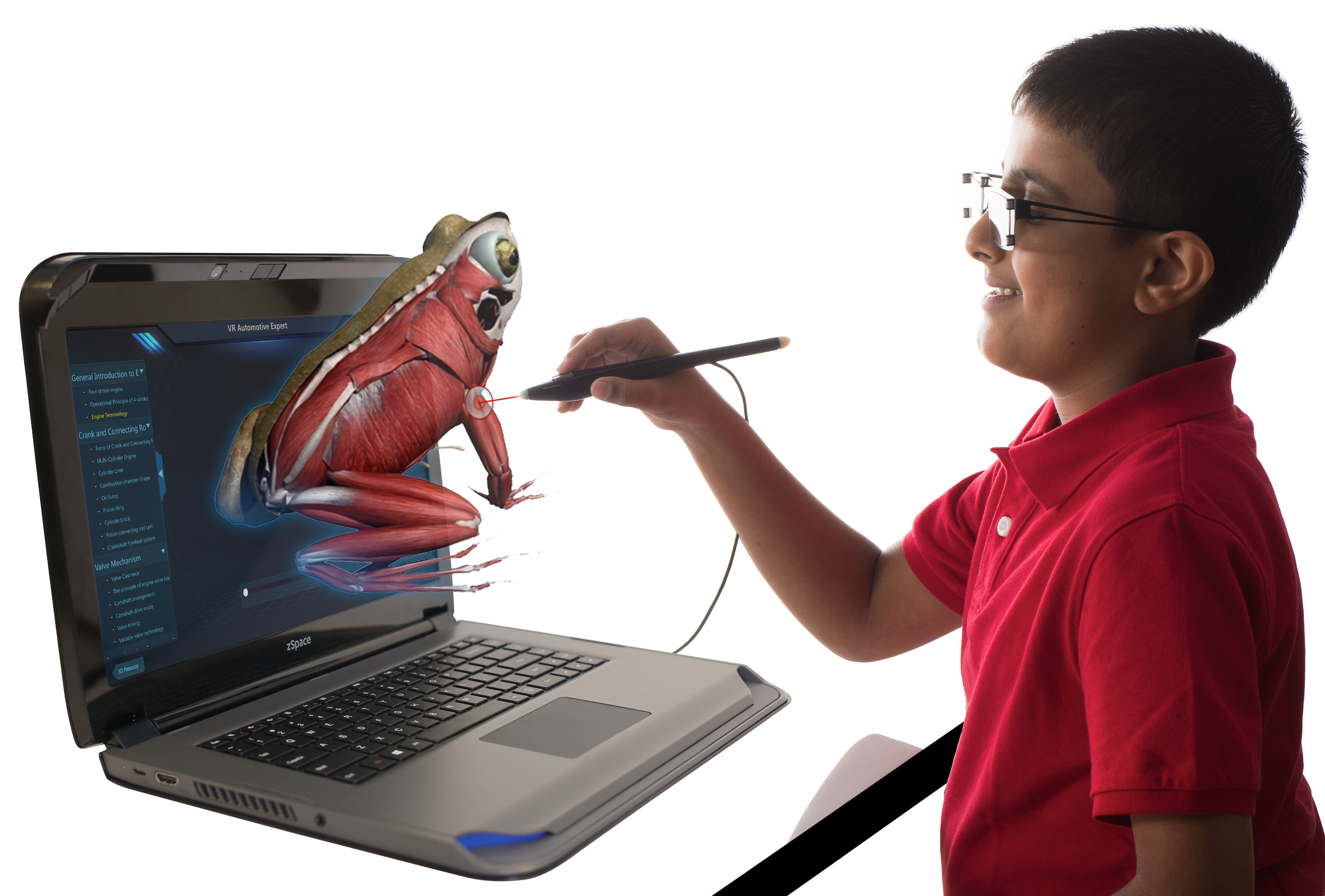
A boy studying with zSpace display

The company's technology has been awarded Tech & Learning's "Best in Show" at the ISTE conference from 2015 to 2019 and the magazine's "Award in Excellence" in 2016, 2017 and 2018. In 2016, zSpace was named one of the 5 most innovative and fast-growing companies in America by Inc. magazine while also ranking 143 on the Inc. 5000 list and second in the Silicon Valley Business Journal. In 2017, zSpace ranked #305 on Inc.'s 5000 lists.

As of 2019, zSpace operates in more than 1,500 school districts, community colleges and universities to over 1 million students. zSpace was recognized on the 2019 Fast Company list for the "World's Most Innovative Companies" in Education. The zSpace Laptop won the 2019 Edison Award in Edutech and the Cool Tool Award for Best VR/AR Solution by EdTech. It was named one of three Grand Prize Winners for Tech & Learning's "Awards of Excellence" for 2019. zSpace was recognized as one of the "100 Best Inventions of 2019" by Time.
