= Geospatial PDF =

Geospatial PDF is a set of geospatial extensions to the Portable Document Format (PDF) 1.7 specification to include information that relates a region in the document page to a region in physical space — called georeferencing. A geospatial PDF can contain geometry such as points, lines, and polygons. These, for example, could represent building locations, road networks and city boundaries, respectively. The georeferencing metadata for geospatial PDF is most commonly encoded in one of two ways: the OGC best practice; and as Adobe's proposed geospatial extensions to ISO 32000. The specifications also allow geometry to have attributes, such as a name or identifying type.

ISO 32000-2 (PDF 2.0), completed in 2017, incorporates geospatial PDF features.

== Overview ==
The popularity of geographic information systems (GIS) and geospatial technology amongst its users has increased the need to share information. However, an obstacle to sharing geospatial data can sometimes be the large file sizes or that the end recipient does not have the appropriate software or reader. The PDF format is widely accepted and is considered the de facto standard for printable documents on the web. This means that users do not require the any proprietary plug-in to read geospatial PDFs created following the PDF 1.7 specification, which was published as ISO 32000-1 standard. In this vein, some features commonly associated with geospatial PDF are simply features of PDF:

- Graphically represent vector and raster information (content and imaging model, PDF 1.0)
- Separate graphics content into different layers (optional content, PDF 1.5)
- Associate of tabular information with graphical features (user properties, PDF 1.6)

== Uses ==
There are many uses for a geospatial PDF. After importing geospatial data into PDF, one can use the data in a variety of ways:

- Find and mark location coordinates.
- Measure distance, perimeter, and area.
- Change the coordinate system and measurement units.
- Copy location coordinates to the clipboard, and then use them to show locations in several web mapping services.
- Register a raster image to create a geospatially aware PDF.

== Support ==
Application support
Name	Read	Create	Edit
ACD Canvas 16 w/ GIS	?	Yes	?
Adobe Acrobat Professional Extended	?	Yes	?
Adobe Acrobat version 9+	Yes	?	?
Adobe Reader version 9+	Yes	?	?
Asseco LIDS	Yes	Yes	?
Avenza Geographic Imager	Yes	Yes	Yes
Avenza MAPublisher	Yes	Yes	Yes
Avenza Maps for iOS	Yes	?	?
Avenza Maps for Android	Yes	?	?
BAE Socet GXP (via TerraGo Publisher for Socet GXP)	?	Yes	?
Bentley Microstation	?	Yes	?
Cadcorp SIS	?	Yes	?
CARIS Bathy DataBASE	?	Yes	?
Exelis ENVI	?	Yes	?
ERDAS IMAGINE (via TerraGo Publisher for IMAGINE)	?	Yes	?
ESRI ArcGIS	?	Yes	?
Geospatial Data Abstraction Library (GDAL)	Yes	Yes	?
GeoEye Analytics EarthWhere	?	Yes	?
Global Mapper	Yes	Yes	?
Hexagon Geospatial GeoMedia (via GeoMedia PDF)	?	Yes	?
i-cubed DataDoors	?	Yes	?
Memento PDF Viewer (www.northavenue.net)	Yes	?	?
Precisely MapInfo Professional	?	Yes	?
QGIS	Yes	Yes	?
TerraGo Composer	Yes	Yes	?
TerraGo Mobile	Yes	?	?
TerraGo Publisher for ArcGIS	Yes	Yes	?
TerraGo Publisher for Raster	?	Yes	?
TerraGo Toolbar	Yes	?	?
Touch GIS	Yes	No	No

There are several software developers that adhere to the PDF 1.7 specification for writing geospatial PDF files:

- Avenza Systems
- Bentley
- Cadcorp
- ESRI
- Precisely
- QGIS
- SAFE Software
- TerraGo Technologies
- Hexagon Geospatial
- SDI

== See also ==
- GeoPDF
- Cartography
- Coordinate system
- GIS
- Graphic file formats
- Geographic projection
- Scalable Vector Graphics
