= Lingotek =

Cloud-based translations service provider

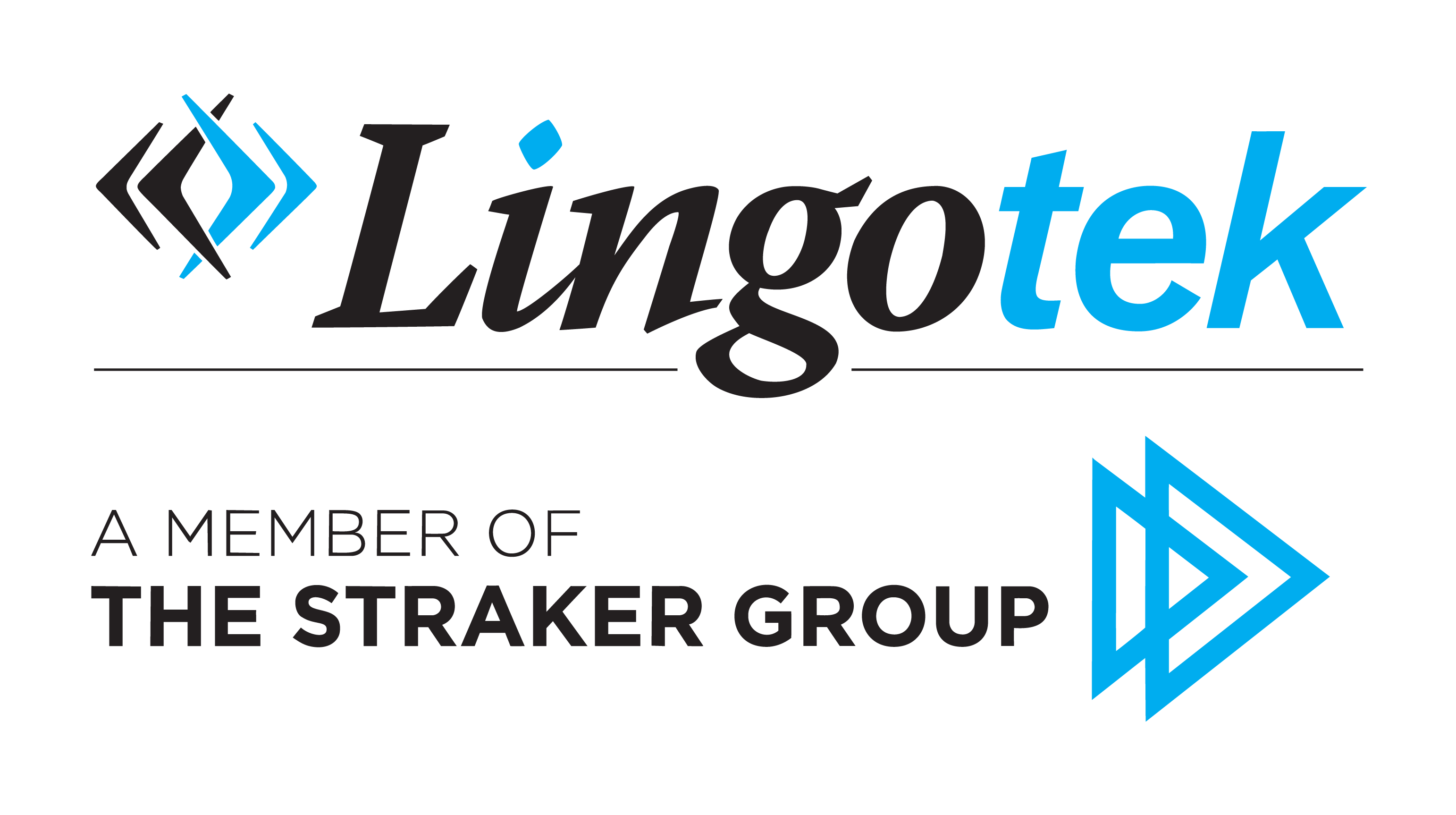

- TMS and Workbench
- Initial release: 2006; 20 years ago
- Type: Content management framework
- Website: lingotek.com

Lingotek is a cloud-based translation services provider, offering translation management software and professional linguistic services for web content, software platforms, product documentation and electronic documents.

== History ==
Lingotek was founded in 2006 by members of the LDS Church, and is the preferred tool for crowdsourced translation within the Church. Although Lingotek was initially marketed to government entities, translation companies, and freelance translators, the current marketing strategy targets larger corporations with translation needs.

It received $1.7 million in Series A-1 venture capital funding from Canopy Ventures and Flywheel Ventures, to develop language search engine technologies.

In August 2006, Lingotek launched a beta version of its collaborative language translation service, which aimed to improve a translator's efficiency by rapidly identifying meaning-based translated material for reuse. This service, called the Lingotek Collaborative Translation Platform, was based on three tiers of translation: automatic, community, and professional.

In 2007, the software development company secured $1.6 million in Series A-2 financing. The A-2 round was led by Canopy Ventures of Lindon, Utah, which contributed $1 million. Previous investors, including Flywheel Ventures, also participated in the A-2 round.

On July 16, 2008, Lingotek received an investment from In-Q-Tel, a not-for-profit investment firm that delivers technology to support the Central Intelligence Agency and the broader U.S. Intelligence Community.

== Products ==
Lingotek's language search engine indexed linguistic knowledge from a repository of multilingual content and language translations, instead of web pages. Users could access its database of previously translated material to find more specific combinations of words for re-use. Lingotek also supported existing translation memory files that were Translation Memory eXchange-compliant memories, thus allowing users to import files into both private and public indices.

In June 2007, Lingotek began offering free access to its language search engine and other web 2.0-based translation-related software tools. Free access to the language search engine included both open and closed translation memory.

In 2008, Lingotek moved to Amazon Web Services's on-demand cloud computing platform. The company introduced software-as-a-service collaborative translation technology in 2009, which combined the workflow and computer-aided translation capabilities of human and machine translation into one application.

In 2010, Lingotek re-positioned its Collaborative Translation Platform as a software-as-a-service product which combined machine translation, real-time community translation, and management tools.

Lingotek's cloud-based CAT system was available on the market in 2012. The translation system can process text files and offers comprehensive support for the localization of web page files in HTML. In addition, the Lingotek computer aided translation tools works with several file types, including:

- Microsoft Office, Microsoft Word, Microsoft PowerPoint, and Microsoft Excel;
- Adobe FrameMaker files;
- Files with the standardized format for localization: XML Localisation Interchange File Format (.xliff), .ttx (XML font file format) files, and .po (portable object);
- Java properties files;
- OpenDocument files;
- Windows resource files;
- Mac OS and OS X; and
- TMX (Translation Memory eXchange).

Lingotek's stand‐alone translation management system can be used to manage translation workflow for different types of assets.

In 2010, Lingotek integrated the Collaborative Translation Platform with other applications. The Lingotek - Inside application programming interface allows users to translate content in web applications such as SharePoint, Drupal, Salesforce.com, Jive Social CRM, and Oracle universal content management.

Lingotek's translation management system added multi-vendor translation, which enables brands to choose any translation agency for in-workflow translation in 2014.

== Awards ==
- Most Innovative Product by Utah Valley Entrepreneurial Forum (2006)
- Stevie Award for Best New Product or Service of the Year – Software as a Service (2010)
- Gartner Cool Vendor of the Year (2012),
- Edison Bronze Award Verbal Communications (2015)
- Top 30 Drupal Contributor (2016)
- Comparably Best Places to Work (2017)
- Utah Best in State Language Services (2017)
