= Empolis =

Software company specializing in content management and knowledge management

- Founded: 1986
- Headquarters: Kaiserslautern, Germany
- Website: empolis.com/en/

Empolis Information Management GmbH is an information management software company specializing in content management and knowledge management.

== History ==
Founded in 1986 as EPS (printing systems) Bertelsmann, a subsidiary of MohnDruck GmbH in Guetersloh, Germany. In 2000, the company was renamed Empolis due to a merger of four German software companies (EPS, Step, Tecinno, and Schnittstelle). In April 2009, Empolis GmbH, Living-e and Attensity Corporation joined forces to become the Attensity Group.

As of May 2010, Living-e and Empolis are doing business under the name Attensity Europe GmbH. In June 2012, the former “Enterprise Solutions” division of Attensity Europe GmbH, spun off and became a legally independent company called “Empolis Information Management GmbH”.

In June 2022, it was announced that proALPHA Business Solutions acquired Empolis.
