= In-Q-Tel =

American defense industry venture capital firm

- Type: Privately held not-for-profit corporation (501(c)(3))
- Genre: Technology research, Government (taxpayer) funded Venture capital firm
- Predecessor: Peleus
- Founded: September 29, 1999; 27 years ago (as Peleus)
- Founders: Norm Augustine; Gilman Louie
- Headquarters: Tysons, Virginia, U.S.
- Key people: Steve Bowsher (President and CEO)
- Services: Investment in information technology supporting U.S. intelligence capability
- Revenue: 108,260,393 USD (2024)
- Total assets: 1,033,475,545 United States dollar (2022)
- Website: www.iqt.org

In-Q-Tel (IQT), formerly Peleus and In-Q-It, is an independent American not-for-profit venture capital firm based in Tysons, Virginia. It invests in companies to keep the US Intelligence Community equipped with the latest in information technology in support of United States intelligence capability. The corporation receives funding primarily through contracts with the CIA and other U.S. government partners, but is not owned by the CIA. The name "In-Q-Tel" is an intentional reference to Q, the fictional inventor who supplies technology to James Bond.

== History ==
Logo as of 2005

Logo as of 2010

The initiative that became In-Q-Tel was developed within the CIA in 1998. The entity was incorporated as Peleus, Inc. on February 17, 1999, and received an initial CIA contract the following month. Its name was changed to In-Q-It in July 1999. After being publicly announced under that name in September 1999, the corporate name was subsequently changed to In-Q-Tel in January 2000.

In-Q-Tel was "the brainchild" of former Director of Central Intelligence George Tenet. Gilman Louie was In-Q-Tel's first CEO and Norm Augustine, a former CEO of Lockheed Martin, led the board of directors. In-Q-Tel's mission is to identify and invest in companies developing cutting-edge technologies that serve United States national security interests. Congress approved funding for In-Q-Tel, which was increased in later years. Origins of the corporation can also be traced to Ruth A. David, who headed the Central Intelligence Agency's Directorate of Science & Technology in the 1990s and promoted the importance of rapidly advancing information technology for the CIA.

The organization was created in part to provide the intelligence community with access to commercially developed technologies rather than relying solely on classified internal research and development. By 2001, In-Q-Tel maintained offices in Rosslyn, Virginia, and Palo Alto, California, from which it searched for commercially developed technologies.

Following the September 11 attacks, government agencies increasingly sought technological advice and expertise from In-Q-Tel, while the number of business plans submitted to the organization rose to two or three times its pre-attack level.

In-Q-Tel engages with entrepreneurs, growth companies, researchers, and venture capitalists to deliver technologies that provide superior capabilities for the CIA, DIA, NGA, and the wider intelligence community. Other U.S. government agencies also work with The Department of Homeland Security's Science & Technology Directorate has described its collaboration with In-Q-Tel as a means of identifying emerging technologies for DHS partners.

In-Q-Tel concentrates on three broad commercial technology areas: software, infrastructure and materials sciences.

Former CIA director George Tenet said,

We [the CIA] decided to use our limited dollars to leverage technology developed elsewhere. In 1999 we chartered ... In-Q-Tel. ... While we pay the bills, In-Q-Tel is independent of CIA. CIA identifies pressing problems, and In-Q-Tel provides the technology to address them. The In-Q-Tel alliance has put the Agency back at the leading edge of technology ... This ... collaboration ... enabled CIA to take advantage of the technology that Las Vegas uses to identify corrupt card players and apply it to link analysis for terrorists [cf. the parallel data-mining effort by the SOCOM-DIA operation Able Danger], and to adapt the technology that online booksellers use and convert it to scour millions of pages of documents looking for unexpected results.

In-Q-Tel invested in mapping company Keyhole, Inc in 2003. Google acquired Keyhole the following year, and its technology became the basis for Google Earth. In-Q-Tel sold 5,636 shares of Google, worth over US$2.2 million, on November 15, 2005. The shares had been acquired as a result of Google's acquisition of Keyhole, Inc.

By 2005, after five years of active operations, In-Q-Tel had reportedly invested in more than 75 companies and delivered more than 100 technologies to the CIA.

Gilman Louie was succeeded as president and CEO by Amit Yoran in January 2006. By that time, In-Q-Tel had 64 employees and formal agreements with the Defense Intelligence Agency, the Federal Bureau of Investigation, and the National Geospatial-Intelligence Agency. Yoran resigned in April 2006 after four months in the position, and Christopher Darby assumed the role of president and CEO in September 2006.

In August 2006, In-Q-Tel reviewed more than 5,800 business plans and invested approximately $150M in more than 90 companies.

In 2009 and 2010, In-Q-Tel invested in technologies for analyzing publicly available online information, including social media monitoring company Visible Technologies and web analysis company Recorded Future.

As of 2016, In-Q-Tel listed 325 investments, but more than 100 were secret, according to the Washington Post.

In 2018 and 2019, In-Q-Tel expanded its activities internationally with the establishment of offices in London and Sydney. In December 2023, the organization announced the opening of a Singapore office to support engagement in the Asia-Pacific region. According to the company’s own milestones record, a further office was added in Munich in 2023.

== Governance ==
=== Relationship with the CIA ===
In-Q-Tel is a Virginia-registered corporation, legally independent of the CIA or any other government agency. The corporation is bound by its Charter agreement and annual contract with the CIA, which set out the relationship between the two organizations. It receives funding from other government partners in the US intelligence and defense communities.

In-Q-Tel's mission (to support the Intelligence Community's technical needs) is promoted by the In-Q-Tel Interface Center (QIC), an office within the CIA that facilitates communication between In-Q-Tel and government intelligence organizations. The QIC also identifies and organizes CIA technology requirements, manages the contractual relationship between the CIA and In-Q-Tel, and guides the process of transferring resulting technologies into the agency. In-Q-Tel's investment personnel, in turn, assess potential investments and their technologies and negotiate investment terms. When In-Q-Tel invests in a company, it typically receives an advisory position on the company's board, providing access to information about the company and continued information exchange.

A review of In-Q-Tel required by the fiscal 2000 Intelligence Authorization, and conducted by Business Executives for National Security in 2001, gave the organization a generally positive assessment but found that the CIA lacked a clear information-technology strategy, did not provide sufficiently clear direction to In-Q-Tel, and was slow to adopt technologies developed through the program.

=== Financial interests ===
While In-Q-Tel is a nonprofit corporation, it differs from IARPA and other models in that its employees historically could profit from its investments through an employee co-investment fund. A Wall Street Journal investigation found that in 2016, nearly half of In-Q-Tel's trustees had a financial connection with a company the corporation had funded.

=== Board and leadership ===
George Tenet assembled the original ten-member board, which met four times a year to review In-Q-Tel's status. Original members of the board include Lee A. Ault, III, Norman R. Augustine, John Seely Brown, Michael M. Crow, Stephen Friedman, Paul G. Kaminski, Jeong H. Kim, Alex J. Mandl, John N. McMahon, and William J. Perry.

Christopher A. Darby was appointed president and chief executive officer in 2006, a position he held until December 2023. On 14 December 2023, Steve Bowsher, formerly the organization's president, was appointed to succeed him as CEO, while Darby transitioned to vice chair of the board. Michael M. Crow an original member of the board, and president of Arizona State University is chair of In-Q-Tel's board.

== Investments ==
In-Q-Tel operations are partially public, but specific products and their uses are classified. Its portfolio, includes a range of technology startups and research initiatives.

=== Software ===
- A4Vision – 3D facial imaging
- Adapx – Microsoft Office & GIS
- Agent Logic – event detection and response software – Webspector webpage change software
- Algorithmic - Infrastructure for deploying and scaling AI/ML models
- Authentica – secure messaging and secure document sharing
- AzTE] PRISM – handwriting recognition
- Boundless Spatial – geospatial software - acquired by Planet Labs
- Carnegie Speech – speech recognition
- Cassatt – desktop software
- D2iQ (formerly Mesosphere) – Apache Mesos and Kubernetes consulting firm
- Dreadnode - AI and offensive security testing
- FMS – analysis, visualization, and knowledgebase to the United States Intelligence Community
- Fetch Technologies – Internet Data Management -bots & RSS
- Fuel3D – 3D scanning
- GeoIQ FortiusOne – visualization on maps
- Geosemble – unstructured data analytics and geospatial software - acquired by TerraGo
- HEO - Space Imagery
- Initiate Systems – real-time multiple database software
- Intelliseek – search engine
- Internet Evidence Finder – Digital forensic tool
- Interset – Security Analytics/User Behavior Analytics
- Looking Glass Factory - Holography
- Mohomine mohoClassifier – organises mass data
- NovoDynamics – Arabic character recognition
- Nozomi Networks – OT and IoT security and visibility
- Oculis Labs – visual cyber security solutions
- PiXlogic – visual search
- Quantum4D – visualization technology
- ReversingLabs – malware detection and analysis
- Sayari – financial intelligence and supply chain risk software mapping global corporate ownership and commercial relationships
- SRD – identity resolution software
- SafeWeb PrivacyMatrix – browsing (closed in Nov. 2001)
- Silver Tail Systems – website fraud prevention
- Stratify – organizes mass data
- TRX Systems – 3D mapping
- Visible Technologies – social media monitoring
- Zaplet – email
- ArcSight – secure software
- Attensity – search engine
- Basis Technology – multilingual text analytics and cyber forensics
- CallMiner – CX automation and conversation intelligence
- Connectify – Wifi & VPN
- Convera RetrievalWare – search engine
- Destineer – games FPS training simulation
- Digital Reasoning – Synthesys v3.0 – review facts and associations at a glance
- Endeca – search data repositories
- FireEye – malware protection
- Forterra Systems – virtual worlds for training
- Huddle – cloud-based content collaboration software
- Inktomi Corp – network infrastructure software
- InnoCentive – crowdsourcing websites
- Inxight – search engine
- Keyhole, Inc – Geospatial visualization application (Acquired by Google in 2004 and would go on to become Google Earth in 2005)
- Language Weaver – automatic language translation
- Lingotek – translation services
- MemSQL – Distributed, in-memory, SQL database management system for real-time analytics
- MetaCarta – search engine
- Palantir Technologies – data integration, search and discovery, knowledge management, and secure collaboration
- Platfora – big data analytics and visualization
- Recorded Future – web intelligence and predictive analytics
- SRA OrionMagic – cms software
- Socrata – Open Data Solutions for Government Innovation
- Spotfire – visualization data analytics
- Tacit Knowledge Systems – internal software
- Teradici Corporation – desktop virtualization
- TerraGo – location intelligence applications and software GeoPDF
- Traction Software – web 2.0
- Visual Sciences – real-time visual analysis
- Wickr - Encrypted messaging application
- zSpace (company) – 3-Dimensional holographic imaging displays

=== Infrastructure ===
Hardware

- Xarion Laser Acoustics – acoustic sensing and ultrasonic imaging
- Xanadu Quantum Technologies – photonic quantum computers
- Tyfone – digital security for mobility, cloud, and IoT
- Stoke Space – reusable rocket
- Starcloud - data centers in space

Data centers

- Bay Microsystems – packet processing and data traffic
- Systems Research and Development – real-time data warehousing
- Network Appliance – Decru (networked data storage)
- JetCool – liquid cooling for data centres

Bioscience

- Colossal Biosciences

=== Natural resources ===
- Phoenix Tailings - rare earths

== Related personnel ==
- Dan Geer (2008–present) Chief Information Security Officer
- Michael D. Griffin – former president; later administrator of NASA.
- Norman R. Augustine
- Gilman Louie – former CEO
- Paul G. Kaminski – former director
- Amit Yoran – former CEO
- John Seely Brown
- Stephen Friedman
- William J. Perry
- Alex J. Mandl
- Rebecca Bace
- Luciana Borio
- Peter Barris
- Anita K. Jones
- Jami Miscik
- Jeong H. Kim
