= List of GIS data sources =

This is a list of GIS data sources (including some geoportals) that provide information sets that can be used in geographic information systems (GIS) and spatial databases for purposes of geospatial analysis and cartographic mapping. This list categorizes the sources of interest.

== Global ==
GIS data for global datasets
Name	Description
Natural Earth	Public domain vector and raster dataset. Supported by the NACIS.
Global Map	Provides consistent coverage of all the Earth's land cover area. Includes different thematic maps such as: transportation, elevation, drainage, vegetation, administrative boundaries, land cover, population centres, and land use. Registration required.
FABDEM	The first global digital elevation model at 30 meter resolution with forests and buildings removed. Produced by researchers from Fathom and the University of Bristol.
UNEP Environmental Data Explorer	Includes global forest cover, global potential evapotranspiration, global average monthly temperatures, dams, watershed boundaries, and much more. Use the advanced search to select geospatial data sets. Provided by the United Nations Environment Programme.
GSHHG	Global Self-consistent, Hierarchical, High-resolution Shoreline Database: high quality, and consistent data.
ASTER GDEM	30m resolution global elevation data derived from Advanced Spaceborne Thermal Emission and Reflection Radiometer satellite images.
OpenTopography	OpenTopography facilitates community access to high-resolution, Earth science-oriented, topography data, and related tools and resources.. Find high-resolution, Earth science-based, topography data, and related tools and resources. Available as dense point clouds and DEMs.
NCAR GIS Climate Change Scenarios	Includes data used by the IPCC in their reports. Operated by the National Center for Atmospheric Research. Registration required.
IRI/LDEO Climate Data Library	Collection of more than 300 datasets from various climate models and datasets. Operated by The Earth Institute and Lamont–Doherty Earth Observatory.
Global Climate Monitor	Climate web viewer containing accessible climatic information from 1901 that can be downloaded in a variety of GIS formats.
HydroSHEDS	Global hydrological data based on the SRTM elevation data. Includes river networks, watershed boundaries, drainage directions, and flow accumulations.
USGS Land Cover Institute	Set of links from the USGS for numerous land cover datasets. Although primarily US data, further down the list there is data for other continents.
Atlas of the Biosphere: Mapping the Biosphere	Raster maps of environmental variables including soil pH, potential evapotranspiration, average snow depth, and more.
Global 200	Vector data from WWF of "a set of the Earth's terrestrial, freshwater, and marine ecoregions that harbor exceptional biodiversity and are representative of its ecosystems."
Global Lakes and Wetlands Database	Vector data created from multiple sources by the WWF and Center for Environmental Systems Research, University of Kassel outlining global wetlands, swamps, bogs, reservoirs, etc.
Conservation GIS Data	Data from The Nature Conservancy and associated organizations, including: TNC Lands & Waters (properties/preserves, easements and leases), Ecoregional Portfolio, Terrestrial Ecoregions of the World, Freshwater Ecoregions of the World, and Marine Ecoregions of the World.
The Biodiversity Hotspots	Data from Conservation International on areas of the world with especially high endemism and high numbers of threatened species.
Pilot Analysis of Global Ecosystems: Forest Ecosystems	Data from the World Resources Institute includes: percentage tree-cover, population density and tree cover, share of wood in fuel consumption, etc.
SoilGrids1km - soil property and class maps	SoilGrids1km is a collection of updatable soil property and class maps of the world at a resolution of 1 km produced using state-of-the-art model-based statistical methods. Presents estimates (means and 90% confidence intervals) for pH, texture (sa, si, cl), organic carbon and more for 6 depth layers up to 2 m depth.
Harmonized World Soil Database	Combines regional and national soil databases and maps under the Land Use Change programme of the Food and Agriculture Organization of the United Nations. Includes pH, depth, and texture parameters. 30 arc-second resolution.
Datasets from the United Nations Environment Programme	Includes global ecoregions, wetlands, distribution of coral reefs, mangroves, and more.
Mineral Resource Data System	A collection of reports from the USGS describing metallic and nonmetallic mineral resources throughout the world. Includes names, location, commodity, description, geologic characteristics, production, reserves, and more.
World Bank Geodata	A wide range of World Bank datasets: schooling and financial data, etc.
Global Administrative Areas	Administrative areas in this database are countries and lower level subdivisions such as provinces, departments, bibhag, bundeslander, daerah istimewa, fivondronana, krong, landsvæðun, opština, sous-préfectures, counties, and thana.
Crop Calendar Dataset	Raster data on planting dates and harvesting dates across the world for 19 crops. Available at 5 minute and 0.5 degree resolutions.
Global Agriculture Lands	Raster dataset from NASA's Socioeconomic Data and Applications Center representing global extent and intensity of use of agricultural lands in 2000. Satellite data from MODIS and SPOT (satellite) image vegetation sensor were combined with agricultural inventory data.
Global Irrigated Area Map (GIAM)	Vector mapping by the International Water Management Institute of global irrigated and rainfed cropland.
Past and Present Agricultural Land Use	Multiple datasets showing agricultural land use dating from 1700 to 2007 for 175 crops.
Historic Croplands Dataset, 1700-1992	Documents historical changes in global land cover: croplands from 1700 to 1992.
Global Reservoir and Dam (GRanD) Database	Vector dataset from NASA's Socioeconomic Data and Applications Center on all reservoirs with a storage capacity >0.1 cubic km.
Armed Conflict Location and Event Dataset	Contains all reported conflict events in 50 countries in developing world, from 1997 to present.
Gridded Population of the World (GPW)	Dataset from NASA's Socioeconomic Data and Applications Center includes raw population, population density, historic, current and predicted.
Global Rural-Urban Mapping Project (GRUMP)	Dataset from NASA's Socioeconomic Data and Applications Center (based on the above data, but includes information on rural and urban population balances).
Global Roads Open Access Data Set (gROADS)	Well documented global dataset from NASA's Socioeconomic Data and Applications Center of roads between settlements using a consistent data model (UNSDI-T v.2) which is, to the extent possible, topologically integrated, and accurate to approximately 50m. Only roads between settlements are included, not residential streets, and the dataset is suitable for mapping at the 1:250,000 level.
OpenStreetMap	Crowdsourced data for the whole world including most things you'd find on a standard local paper map: points of interest, buildings, roads and road names, ferry routes etc.
World Port Index	Contains the location and physical characteristics of, and the facilities and services offered by major ports and terminals worldwide, from the United States National Geospatial-Intelligence Agency.
OpenFlights Airport, Airline and Route Data	Includes all known airports, and a large number of routes between airports (not provided in GIS data formats, but can easily be converted from CSV).
GeoHive	Population and county statistics (not provided in GIS data formats, but can easily be converted from CSV).
Viewfinderpanoramas Digital Elevation Model (DEM) repository	Global digital elevation model data maintained by Jonathan de Ferranti. Major areas of coverage includes: Asia, North America, South America, Alps, North, Other Europe, Africa, Antarctica, others.
CHELSA Climatologies at high resolution for the earth's land surface areas	Global climatologies at 30 arc sec (~1 km) resolution for land surface temperature and precipitation. Free under the creative commons CC BY license. Files in GEOTiff format
Orrbodies	Includes geology, topography and mineral occurrence data for several countries as well as globally. Files are mostly in MapInfo format. Both free and commercial datasets available.
Rextag Global Energy GIS Data	Covers more than two million miles (3.2 Million Km) of oil and gas pipelines, and thousands of energy facilities, such as refineries, LNG terminal, gas processing plants, terminal, and much more.
International Peace Information Service (IPIS) Open Data	Datasets originate from International Peace Information Service (IPIS) 's data collection campaigns and research in sub-Saharan Africa with a thematic focus on natural resources, conflict motives of armed actors, business and human rights, and international arms transfers.
The OCC Environmental Data Commons	Repository for environmental public data sets of scientific interest, hosted as part of the Open Science Data Cloud Ecosystem.
OpenAerialMap	OpenAerialMap (OAM) is a set of tools for searching, sharing, and using openly licensed satellite and unmanned aerial vehicle (UAV) imagery.
OpenLandMap	World's environmental data representing land mask (land cover, vegetation, soil, climate, terrain data and similar)
IPUMS International	Harmonized International Census Data for Social Science and Health Research
The Diplomatic and Consular Networks Database and Rankings	World diplomatic and consular networks, including sending states, hosting states, hosting cities, and post types such as embassies, high commissions, consulates, and permanent missions, from the Consular Affairs Center

== Polar region ==
GIS data for Polar datasets (only)
Name	Description
REMA	The Reference Elevation Model of Antarctica (REMA) is a high resolution, time-stamped Digital Surface Model (DSM) of Antarctica at 8-meter spatial resolution.

== Europe ==
GIS data for European datasets
Name	Description
INSPIRE	Infrastructure for Spatial Information in the European Community; primarily a geoportal; contains many resources pertaining to GIS governance in the European Union. For example: INSPIRE Thematic Working Group Cadastral Parcels — This document describes the INSPIRE data specifications for the spatial data theme Cadastral Parcels.
European Soil Data Centre (ESDAC)	Unique point for soil related data at continental scale. Among others: The European Soil Database, Soil erosion assessment, Soil Organic carbon, soil biodiversity, LUCAS data, etc
European Union Open Data Portal	Search for and download a variety of datasets from European Union agencies.
European Environmental Agency Geodata	Search for and download a variety of datasets from the European Environment Agency.

=== Europe by country ===
Cyprus

GIS data for Cyprus
Name	Description
Department of Lands and Surveys	Geospatial and administrative data from the Department of Lands and Surveys.
INSPIRE GeoPortal of Cyprus	Geospatial data from the Department of Lands and Surveys.

==== Czech Republic ====
GIS data for the Czech Republic
Name	Description
arcdata.cz	The digital vector geographical database of the Czech Republic ArcČR® 500 is created in the detail of the scale 1: 500 000. Its content is clear geographical information about the Czech Republic. The data were created in cooperation with ARCDATA PRAHA, s.r.o., the Surveying and Mapping Authority and the Czech Statistical Office and are distributed free of charge.

==== Greece ====
GIS data for Greece
Name	Description
geodata.gov.gr	geodata.gov.gr is designed, developed and maintained by the Institute of Information Systems of the Research Center "Athena" to serve as a central collection point, search, distribution and display of open public geospatial information.
American School of Classical Studies at Athens, Corinth Excavations	Collection of data for Greece, the Corinthia, and Ancient Corinth; contains many data resources pertaining to GIS in Greece, modern and ancient. The page is maintained by the Corinth Excavations of the American School of Classical Studies at Athens which has been excavating in Ancient Corinth since 1896.

==== Lithuania ====
GIS data for Lithuania
Name	Description
Geographic information portal of Lithuania	Geographic information portal of Lithuania.

Czech Republic

==== Sweden ====
GIS data for Sweden
Name	License	Description
Geodataportalen	Various	National geoportal organized by Lantmäteriet, the national geoinformation agency, indexing geodata from various agencies.
Länsstyrelsernas geodatakatalog (Swedish)	Various	Geoportal from the counties, indexing geodata primarily used as basis for regional development and decisions.
Lantmäteriet open geodata	CC0	GIS-friendly geodata available from the national geoinformation agency. Requires creating an account.
Trafikverket Lastkajen (Swedish)	CC0	Geodata of railroad & road networks, from the transport agency.

== Brazil ==
GIS data for Brasil
Name	Description
GIS Dataset Brasil	Geospatial data for Brazilian cities, microrregião, mesorregião and states.
SIGMINE	Brazilian Mining Geographic Information System.
SIGEL	Geographic Information System of the electric sector.
INDE	National Infrastructure of Spatial Data
SNIRH	National System of Water Resources Information

== Canada ==
GIS data for Canada
Name	Description
CanadianGIS	Geospatial data products from all Canadian Provinces and Territories.
Geogratis	Search for and download many federally produced geospatial products from the Government of Canada.
Navmart |	Provider of both geospatial data & location platform integrations

=== Canada Regional ===
Regional GIS data for Canadian Provinces and Territories
Name	Description
GeoDiscover Alberta Portal	Alberta regional GIS datasets on a variety of topics hosted by the Alberta Government.
DataBC Data Catalogue	Spatial and aspatial data from the province of British Columbia.
Land Information Ontario	Spatial data from the province of Ontario.
Manitoba Land Initiative	Spatial data from the province of Manitoba.
GeoNB Find it. Map it. Share it.	GeoNB is the Province of New Brunswick's gateway to geographic information and related value-added applications. Use "Data Catalogue" link to access files.

== India ==
GIS data for India
Name	Description
Geo-Platform of ISRO	Bhuvan - an Indian Geo-platform of ISRO by National Remote Sensing Centre (NRSC).
Open Data Archive	Bhuvan - GIS - Open Data Archive from NRSC.

== United States ==
GIS data for the United States
Name	Description
The National Map	Topographic data from the USGS and other federal, state, and local partners.
National Geophysical Data Center	All free data from the NGSC. Includes elevation models, land cover, seismology, etc.
The Geospatial Platform	Search for and download a wide variety of datasets from this portal developed by the member agencies of the Federal Geographic Data Committee through collaboration with partners and stakeholders.
USDA ERS Data Products	Data from the Economic Research Service, including the Atlas of Rural and Small-Town America, Farm Program Atlas, Food Access Research Atlas, and Food Environment Atlas.
USGS Remote Sensing Phenology	Data from the USGS on seasonal changes in vegetation across the US. Includes start of season, time of maximum, ampliture, etc.
Terrestrial Ecological Systems of the United States	A mid-scale ecological classification of over 800 ecosystems in North America.
USGS Gap Analysis Program	The USGS Gap Analysis Program maintains four primary data sets: land cover, protected areas, species and aquatic. The GAP Land Cover Data Set is the most complete map ever produced of vegetative associations for the US. Classified into 551 ecological systems, and 32 modified ecological systems (where human impacts have had an effect).
National Hydrology Dataset	Hydrological information for the US. Includes lakes, ponds, streams, rivers, dams, streamguages, and flow modelling.
National Water Quality Assessment Data Warehouse	Large amounts of georeferenced data about water quality. Includes ground and surfacewater sampling data, discharges and health information.
OpenTopography	OpenTopography facilitates community access to high-resolution, Earth science-oriented, topography data, and related tools and resources. Supported by the National Science Foundation (NSF).
NOAA Coastal Service Center	Coastal related datasets such as: benthic cover, LIDAR, high resolution ortho, marine jurisdictions, coastal ifSAR, etc.
US Census Bureau US basemaps and US demographic data	U.S. Gazetteer, TIGER/Line shapefiles, census data.
National Historical Geographic Information System	NHGIS provides free of charge, aggregate census data and GIS-compatible boundary files for the United States between 1790 and 2012.
Atlas of Historical County Boundaries Project (AHCBP)	The AHCBP documents all boundary changes in states and counties in United States territory, including non-county areas never before compiled or mapped, providing unrivaled historical and geographic coverage. Primary sources are cited for every change, providing extensive historical documentation.
USDA Natural Resources Conservation Services	USDA NRCS soil data. Can interact with the dataset with Web Soil Survey online mapping tool.
Libre Map Project	Online collection of all digital USGS 1:24K scale topographic maps (as well as various other GIS data) covering the United States, available as a free download.
NPScape	United States Department of the Interior National Park Service NPScape is a landscape dynamics monitoring project that provides landscape-level data, tools, and evaluations for natural resource management, planning, and interpretation.
Government ArcGIS server addresses	Curated list of 3,500+ ArcGIS server addresses from federal to local. Updated once per week. Bad links fixed or flagged.
NOAA Big Data Project	NOAA generates tens of terabytes of data a day from satellites, radars, ships, weather models, and other sources. While these data are publicly available, it is difficult to download and work with such high volumes. NOAA's vast wealth of data therefore represents a substantial untapped economic opportunity. The NOAA Big Data Project (BDP) was created to explore the potential benefits of storing copies of key observations and model outputs in the Cloud to allow computing directly on the data without requiring further distribution. Such an approach could help form new lines of business and economic growth while making NOAA's data more easily accessible to the American public.

=== United States Regional ===
GIS data for United States regions
Name	Description
Maps and GIS of the Great Lakes Region	Great Lakes regional GIS datasets on a variety of topics hosted by the Great Lakes Commission.
Regional Ecosystem Office Information Center/Library	Datasets developed for the Northwest Forest Plan: DEM, digital raster graphic, land use, watersheds, old growth, habitat, etc.
NOAA Digital Coast Data Registry	Search for and download a variety of datasets from the United States National Oceanic and Atmospheric Administration.

=== Alabama ===
GIS data for State of Alabama
Name	Description
Alabama GeoHub	Public geodata page for Alabama, maintained through an Esri web platform.
Geological Survey of Alabama	Combined sites for the Geological Survey of Alabama and the State of Alabama Oil and Gas Board. Houses / references some Alabama-specific GIS data.

=== Alaska ===
GIS data for State of Alaska
Name	Description
Alaska Geospatial Clearinghouse	Public data clearinghouse for Alaska.

=== Connecticut ===
GIS data for State of Connecticut
Name	Description
CT DEEP GIS Data	The Connecticut Department of Energy and Environmental Protection provides shapefile and ArcGIS datasets.
UCONN MAGIC GIS Datasets	The University of Connecticut provides shapefile and KML datasets through its Map and Geographic Information Center.

=== Florida ===
GIS data for State of Florida
Name	Description
MyFlorida GIS Resource List	List of GIS resources maintained by the office of the governor.
Florida Geographic Data Library	Geodata warehouse maintained by the University of Florida's GeoPlan Center.
FGDL Data Sources	Data source links maintained by the University of Florida's GeoPlan Center.

=== Kentucky ===
GIS data for State of Kentucky
Name	Description
Kentucky Geography Portal	The Kentucky Geoportal is a Data Clearinghouse that provides ays to discover and share geospatial data resources. Locate maps and geographic data content for a particular part of the state or search based on keyword or theme type.
Kentucky Open Data Portal	The Kentucky Open Data Portal is a site for exploring, accessing and downloading Kentucky-specific GIS data and discovering mapping apps. You can analyze and combine datasets using maps, as well as develop new web and mobile applications.
KyFromAbove	The KyFromAbove initiative is focused on building and maintaining a current basemap for the Commonwealth that can meet the needs of its users at the state, federal, local, and regional level. A common basemap, including current color leaf-off aerial photography and elevation data (LiDAR), reduces the cost of developing GIS applications, promotes data sharing, and add efficiencies to many state agency business processes. All basemap data acquired through this effort is being made available in the public domain.
Lexington Open Data Portal	Lexington's Open Data Portal is a collaborative effort between LFUCG and the community. Provides government data in standards compliant, machine readable format.
Louisville/Jefferson County Information Consortium (LOJIC)	The Louisville/Jefferson County Information Consortium (LOJIC) is a multi-agency partnership to build and maintain a Geographic Information System (GIS) to serve Louisville Metro and Jefferson County.
Road Centerline and Highway Information System Data	The road centerline network and highway information system (HIS) data is collected and maintained by the Kentucky Transportation Cabinet.

=== Louisiana ===
GIS data for State of Louisiana
Name	Description
Louisiana Atlas GIS	The Louisiana Atlas is a data distribution system hosting a variety of publicly available GIS datasets for the state of Louisiana. Operated by Louisiana State University.

=== Maryland ===
GIS data for State of Maryland
Name	Description
MD iMap	The Maryland Integrated Map (MD iMap) is an enterprise statewide mapping system. MD iMap also provides ArcGIS server web services.

=== Pennsylvania ===
GIS data for Commonwealth of Pennsylvania
Name	Description
Pennsylvania Spatial Data Access	State wide GIS datasets provided by Pennsylvania State University
Open Data Philly	Data repository for the City of Philadelphia, which includes GIS data-sets relating to the Philadelphia region, available to view and download in various formats
York County Open Data Portal	Data repository for York County, which includes GIS data-sets relating to York County PA, available to view and download in various formats

=== South Carolina ===
GIS Data for South Carolina
Name	Description
SCGIS Data Page	The South Carolina GIS Coordination Council provides links to data maintained by eight coordinated state agencies.

=== Washington State ===
GIS data for Washington State
Name	Description
Washington State Geospatial Portal	Links to all public-facing GIS data produced/maintained by state agencies in Washington.
Washington State Geospatial Clearinghouse	Metadata catalog portal.
University of Washington Libraries Hosted Geodata, aka WAGDA 2.0	Various Washington State GIS datasets on a variety of topics at state- and county-level, hosted by the University of Washington.
Office of Financial Management	Census data; economy; county government finance; human services; etc.
Washington State GIS Data	A list of data sources at University of Washington Libraries.
Geomorphological Research Group	Data from the University of Washington.
WSDOT Geodata Distribution Catalog	Datasets from the Washington State Department of Transportation.
GIS Data: Washington State Department of Ecology	Large repository of datasets for the state.
Washington State Department of Agriculture	Agricultural datasets; complete map of land use.
Puget Sound River History Project	Historical GIS data for Puget Sound.
Puget sound LIDAR Consortium	Public-domain high-resolution topography for the Pacific Northwest.

== South Africa ==
GIS data for the Republic of South Africa
Name	Description
1map	The 1map online GIS repository hosts public domain GIS information for the entire South Africa, including cadastral data, aerial imagery, and topographical data.

== See also ==
- Geoportal
- National lidar dataset, for a list of sources of airborne lidar datasets
- Wikipedia:Graphics Lab/Resources/GIS sources and palettes
