= Geoportal =

Type of web portal for geographic information

A geoportal is a type of web portal used to find and access geographic information (geospatial information) and associated geographic services (display, editing, analysis, etc.) via the Internet. Geoportals are important for effective use of geographic information systems (GIS) and a key element of a spatial data infrastructure (SDI).

Geographic information providers, including government agencies and commercial sources, use geoportals to publish descriptions (geospatial metadata) of their geographic information. Geographic information consumers, professional or casual, use geoportals to search and access the information they need. Thus geoportals serve an increasingly important role in the sharing of geographic information and can avoid duplicated efforts, inconsistencies, delays, confusion, and wasted resources.

== Background ==
The U.S. National Spatial Data Infrastructure (NSDI), started in 1994 (see OMB Circular A-16), is considered the earliest geoportal concept. The U.S. Federal Geospatial Data Committee (FGDC) coordinated development of the Federal Geographic Data Clearinghouse (or NSDI Clearinghouse Network), the first large geoportal. It has many distributed catalogs that can be searched via a client interface.

First released in 2003, the Geospatial One-Stop (GOS) geoportal was developed as part of a U.S. e-government initiative. Unlike the NSDI Clearinghouse Network, GOS was built around a centralized metadata catalog database, with an architecture that links users to data providers through a Web-based geoportal. The user of GOS may employ a simple Web browser (thin client) or may interface directly with a GIS (thick client).

In September 2011, GOS was retired and the content it included by then became part of the broader open data site (Geo.)Data.gov. At the same time, the United States federal government launched the Geospatial Platform, which represents a shift from focusing on cataloging references to resources, to providing shared web services for national significant datasets, API for developers, and end-user applications (built on those web services and API).

More recently, there has been a proliferation of geoportals for sharing of geographic information based on region or theme. Examples include the INSPIRE geoportal (Infrastructure for Spatial Information in the European Community, established in 2007), the NatCarb geoportal, which provides geographic information concerning carbon sequestration in the United States, and UNSDI, the United Nations Spatial Data Infrastructure.

Modern web-based geoportals include direct access to raw data in multiple formats, complete metadata, online visualization tools so users can create maps with data in the portal, automated provenance linkages across users, datasets and created maps, commenting mechanisms to discuss data quality and interpretation, and sharing or exporting created maps in various formats. Open portals allow user contribution of datasets as well.

Geoportals also form a key component of commercial cloud-based GIS platforms, providing a library of geographic data that users can employ with online GIS tools or desktop GIS software. Google Earth Engine is a cloud-based image processing platform that includes a portal to several petabytes of satellite imagery. Esri's ArcGIS Online, with its Living Atlas Geoportal, provides a large of volume of data covering a wide variety of topics. Esri also sells Portal for ArcGIS as part of its ArcGIS Enterprise server software, which enables institutions to create their own geoportals.

Despite the central role of geoportals across communities and aims, these tools are still scarcely known and widely underappreciated, particularly in the marine realm. Most studies on geoportals have focused on describing individual tools mostly by the developers, and an overview of their potential applications is still missing, limiting their use. A recent review analysed 147 geoportals highlightiong an important increase of interest towards geoportals: from 710 in September 2005 to 1469 in October 2024. The European and Asiatic countries resulted the most representative regions increasing geoportal numbers and related queries. The continuous development, use, and improvement of geoportals will consistently support the decision-making process in Marine Spatial Plannig. Geoportals that are easy to access and query, and following the FAIR (Findable, Accessible, Interoperable and Reusable) data principles will substantially contribute to the exploration of the undiscovered parts of our planet, ensuring tools aimed to the safety of the oceans from hazards and climate changes, to sustainable ecosystem services (eg. energy and food consumption) and to effectively manage the ocean space.

== See also ==
- Georeference
- List of GIS data sources
- National Mapping Agency#List of national mapping agencies
- Spatial Data Infrastructure

== Sources ==
- Fu, P., and J. Sun. 2010. Web GIS: Principles and Applications. ESRI Press. Redlands, CA. ISBN 1-58948-245-X.
- Goodchild, M.F., P. Fu, and P.M. Rich. 2007. Geographic information sharing: the case of the Geospatial One-Stop portal. Annals of the Association of American Geographers 97(2):250-266.
- Maguire, D.J., and P.A. Longley. 2005. The emergence of geoportals and their role in spatial data infrastructures. Computers, Environment and Urban Systems 29: 3-14.
- Tang, W. and Selwood, J. 2005. Spatial Portals: Gateways to Spatial Information. ESRI Press, Redlands, CA.
