= South African Spatial Data Infrastructure =

Initiative of the South African government

The South African Spatial Data Infrastructure (SASDI) is an initiative of the South African government that makes policies and technical standards on the use of geographical data such as maps, aerial and satellite photographs, and surveys. It also seeks to facilitate the capture, management, maintenance, integration, distribution and use of spatial information in South Africa. SASDI is under development by the Committee for Spatial Information (CSI).

Parliament passed the Spatial Data Infrastructure Act, which established the CSI, in December 2003, and the President assented to the act in February 2004.

== Significance ==
A spatial data infrastructure (SDI) is a data infrastructure implementing a framework of geographic data, metadata, users and tools that are interactively connected in order to use spatial data in an efficient and flexible way. SASDI promotes efficiency by using state resources by sharing information among different spheres of government.

The act's passage was an acknowledgement of the strategic value of spatial information for South Africa. It is important that all SASDI stakeholders, including users, gain an understanding and appreciation of the value of spatial information for planning, management and decision-making.

The CSI consists of a principal committee and six subcommittees (data, systems, standards, policy and legislation, education and training, and marketing and communication).
