= Mariano Zamorano Diez =

Argentinian geographer

Mariano Zamorano Diez (Mendoza, June 28, 1920 – Mendoza, September 17, 2010) was an Argentine geographer. He was vice president of the International Geographical Union between 1968 and 1976. In 1985, he was designated "Commandeur of the Ordre des Palmes Academiques" by the French Republic.

== Biography ==
Mariano Zamorano obtained his degree as a Professor of History and Geography from the National University of Cuyo in 1947. He earned a PhD in Literature, specializing in geography, from the University of Bordeaux (France) in 1954, where he had mentors such as Lluís Solé Sabarís, Pierre Deffontaines, and Salvador Llobet Reverter. At the National University of Cuyo, he held the positions of Associate and Full Professor of Human geography, Vice-dean, Dean, Vice-rector and Rector (1962–1963). He was also Director of the Institute of Geography of Mendoza. Throughout his career, he taught classes at more than twenty Argentine, American and European Universities, frequently collaborating with Doctor Joan Vilà i Valentí.

== Distinctions ==
In 2009, the Pan American Institute of Geography and History awarded him the Pan American Medal of Geography

== Works ==
- (1961). Le médoc viticole - Bordeaux (France).
- (1965). La enseñanza de la geografía en la escuela secundaria. Buenos Aires (Argentina): Eudeba.
- (1975). Geografía de América Latina. Métodos y temas monográficos. Barcelona (Spain): Teide.
- (1985). "La organización espacial de los oasis irrigados de Mendoza y San Juan". Paralelo 37, 8-663-674..
- (1988). Argentina I y II. Recursos y regiones. Madrid (Spain): Anaya. Biblioteca iberoamericana.
- (2008). La vitivinicultura del Médoc y de Mendoza en una visión geográfica retrospectiva. Mendoza (Argentina): Editorial de la Facultad de Filosofía y Letras.
