= Walter H. F. Smith =

Geophysicist

Walter H. F. Smith is a geophysicist, currently working in NOAA's Laboratory for Satellite Altimetry. He was formerly Chair of the scientific and technical sub-committee of GEBCO from 2003 to 2013.

Smith earned a BSc at the University of Southern California, and an MA, MPhil and PhD degrees at Columbia University. He was a post-doctoral fellow at the Institute for Geophysics and Planetary Physics of the Scripps Institution of Oceanography until joining NOAA in 1992. Smith is a fellow of the American Geophysical Union, nominated for his contributions to marine geodesy.

Along with Pål Wessel, Smith created the Generic Mapping Tools, an open-source collection of computer software tools for processing and displaying geographic and Cartesian datasets. Smith and Wessel developed and maintain the Global Self-consistent, Hierarchical, High-resolution Geography Database. He received the inaugural M. King Hubbert Award in 1973.

== Selected research ==
- Wessel, P.; Smith, W. H. F. (1991). "Free software helps map and display data". Eos, Transactions American Geophysical Union. 72 (41). American Geophysical Union (AGU): 441. Bibcode:1991EOSTr..72..441W. doi:10.1029/90eo00319. ISSN 0096-3941.
- Smith, Walter H. F.; Sandwell, David T. (1997). "Global Sea Floor Topography from Satellite Altimetry and Ship Depth Soundings". Science. 277 (5334). American Association for the Advancement of Science: 1956–1962. doi:10.1126/science.277.5334.1956. ISSN 0036-8075. JSTOR 2893884.
- Wessel, Paul; Smith, Walter H. F. (November 24, 1998). "New, improved version of generic mapping tools released". Eos, Transactions American Geophysical Union. 79 (47). American Geophysical Union (AGU): 579. Bibcode:1998EOSTr..79..579W. doi:10.1029/98eo00426. ISSN 0096-3941.
- Wessel, Paul; Smith, Walter H. F.; Scharroo, Remko; Luis, Joaquim; Wobbe, Florian (November 5, 2013). "Generic Mapping Tools: Improved Version Released". Eos, Transactions American Geophysical Union. 94 (45). American Geophysical Union (AGU): 409–410. Bibcode:2013EOSTr..94..409W. doi:10.1002/2013eo450001. ISSN 0096-3941.
