= Computer mapping =

Computer mapping may refer to any mapping procedure done with the aid of computers:

- in computer graphics
  - 3D projection
  - texture mapping, normal mapping, tone mapping, ... etc.
- in geography geographic information system
  - Computer cartography, the art, science, and technology of making and using maps with a computer
  - Web mapping, the process of using, creating, and distributing maps on the Web
  - Generic Mapping Tools, open-source software for producing maps
- any of various methods in bioinformatics that have to do with gene mapping
