= Snit =

Snit or SNIT may refer to:

== Arts and entertainment ==
- Branwell F. Snit, character in a comic strip created by Morgan Sanders
- Snit Mandolin, main character in the 2009 Canadian film Hungry Hills
- Droopy "Snit" McCool, a minor character in the film Return of the Jedi
- Snit (mascot), a robotic character on Canadian TV channel YTV
- Šnit, a 2007 Igor Marojević novel
- Snits, creatures in the board game Snit's Revenge

== Other uses ==
- Snit, nickname of Atlanta Braves manager Brian Snitker
- Snit (horse), a Thoroughbred horse which won the 1997 Cotillion Handicap
- National System of Land Information or Sistema Nacional de Información Territorial (SNIT), government entity in Chile participating in GeoSUR
- Shree Narayan Institute of Technology (SNIT), a college in Khargone, India
- Snit, an object-oriented extension to the Tcl programming language
- Snit, a unit of measurement for alcoholic drinks
- Snit, Jamaican name for the fish Haemulon vittatum
- Snits, West Frisian name for the Dutch city Sneek

== See also ==
- The Big Snit, a 1985 Canadian animated cartoon
- Moskva šnit, a popular fruitcake created by Hotel Moskva in Belgrade, Serbia
