= GeoSUR =

Initiative to develop a regional geospatial network

GEOSUR
Type
- Free access web technology system
- Data: Geospatial information
- Opening: 2007
- Languages: Spanish, English, Portuguese
- Members: 90 Institutions from Latin America and the Caribbean
- License: Free access
- Management: PAIGH and CAF
- Specialized software: Does not require
- Web site: www.geosur.info
- Map viewer: http://www.geosur.info/map-viewer

GeoSUR is a regional initiative led by spatial data producers in Latin America and the Caribbean to implement a geospatial network and help establish the basis of a spatial data infrastructure in the region. GeoSUR supports the development of free access geographic services useful to find, view and analyze spatial information through maps, satellite images, and geographic data.

Participation in the network is open to any spatial data producer that is willing to place their geospatial information at the public's disposal and for the development of the region. Participation by institutions that generate useful information for decision making and development activities is emphasized.

The network is headed by CAF – Development Bank of Latin America and the Caribbean, and the Pan-American Institute of Geography and History (PAIGH). More than 90 regional and national institutions participating, among which the ministries of planning and public works, environment, and regional geographic agencies that were among the first to join.

GeoSUR has received five international awards:

- Special Achievement in GIS 2010, ESRI International User Conference 2010
- Latin American Geospatial Excellence Award, Latin American Geospatial Forum 2011
- NASIG 2012 Award, ESRI Venezuela
- Presidential Award for GeoSUR, Portal of the Americas, ESRI International User Conference 2012
- MundoGeoConnect 2013 Award, Special Award.

== History ==
In Latin America and the Caribbean, the construction of some of the key technical components of a regional spatial data infrastructure has taken over 15 years of efforts by multiple players. Following are the key milestones of this process:

- The establishment of SIRGAS at the International Conference for the Definition of a Geocentric Reference System for South America, in Asuncion (Paraguay, 1993).
- The establishment of the Inter-American Geospatial Data Network (IGDN) in 1995.
- The resolutions adopted by the four United Nations Regional Cartography Conferences for the Americas.
- The resolution of February 2000 in Bogota, Colombia, in which 21 American nations created the Permanent Committee for SDI in the Americas (CP-IDEA).
- The resolutions of the Consultation Meetings of the Cartography Commission of PAIGH in 2001 and 2005, and of PAIGH's 18th General Assembly (Venezuela, 2005).
- The declaration Development of Spatial Data Infrastructures in America by PAIGH's Executive Council, issued in Bogota in 2007.
- The Inter-American Science and Technology Program of the Organization of American States (OAS) (Peru, 2003) which incorporated the Hemispheric Cooperation Initiative in the Field of Geographic Information for the Comprehensive Development of the Americas, and Resolution 2328 of the 37th General Assembly of the OAS (Panama, 2007).
- The world conferences of the Association for the Global Spatial Data Infrastructure carried out in the region (Colombia, 2001; Chile, 2006, Trinidad and Tobago, 2008 and Canada, 2012).

The Geographic Information Network of Latin America and the Caribbean was launched in 2007, during PAIGH's annual meeting in Brasilia, it is supported by the GeoSUR Program, and aimed at the development of national and regional geoservices open to the public. During the first years of the Network's operation, diverse regional geoservices were developed and staged on the web, and the participation of a large number of national institutions was consolidated. From a cradle of around 10 agencies in 2007, GeoSUR grew exponentially and managed to incorporate more than 80 new agencies in the following six years.

In 2012, in the framework of the 44th Meeting of PAIGH's Executive Board, which took place in Buenos Aires, a document was subscribed with the purpose of strengthening, harmonizing, and accelerating the development of the spatial data infrastructures of the Americas in a coordinated and effective manner. The document was subscribed by representatives from CAF (GeoSUR Program), PAIGH, SIRGAS, and GGIM Americas.

Toward the end of 2013, more than 90 institutions from 24 countries in Latin America and the Caribbean participated in the Program. These institutions provide geographic information which is useful for the planners of the region, using modern technologies to manage geo-information, spatial data infrastructures, and several geospatial components.

== GeoSUR Architecture ==
The Network's architecture is ruled by the basic guidelines for the development of geoservices defined for the spatial data infrastructures (SDI), it is decentralized, and it is based on the use of OGC and ISO standards and protocols that enable interoperability between the different nodes and components that make up the Network.

The Network's regional geoservices are operated and maintained by CAF and PAIGH, with support from the U.S. Geological Survey (USGS). Most of the geoservices with national, sub-national, and urban datasets are maintained and operated directly by the participating institutions.

The GeoSUR Platform is made up of five components:

- The Latin America and Caribbean Regional Portal
- The Regional Map Service
- The Regional Topographic Processing Service
- A network of geoservices
- The Online ArcGIS Regional Portal.

== Components ==
=== 1. The Latin America and Caribbean Regional Portal ===
With the support of the USGS Earth Resources Observation and Science Center (EROS), GeoSUR developed the first regional portal for Latin America and the Caribbean in March 2007. The portal offers free access to an important collection of regional geospatial information, it contains detailed descriptions of thousands of spatial datasets, and connects the user to a great variety of maps and geographic services operated and maintained by participating institutions from 24 countries.

The Portal has a complete data base of metadata that describes the spatial data that have been developed by the participating institutions. This data base is connected to similar catalogues operated by these institutions and is periodically updated through an automatic metadata collection mechanism. The Portal has more than 13,000 metadata records in its central data base, and offers access, through a search mechanism, to more than 500,000 metadata records found in other catalogues. The GeoSUR Portal also provided access to a regional map viewer and a topographic processing service that will be described further on.

The Portal was developed with ESRI's Geoportal Server and uses the Joomla content management system.

=== 2. The Map Regional Service ===
This spatial data visualization service was designed by CAF and it was developed and it is hosted by EROS. The service contains information on supranational maps generated by third party institutions, and it offers access to national and local maps available in viewers operated by participating institutions. Most of the supranational information is public and is available for free download. The service has been in operation since January 2008 and it was built with ArcGIS Server 10.1. The service viewer was built using Flex technology.

The viewer also provides access to more than 10,000 digital maps contained in more than 350 OGC-based geoservices operated by participating institutions, integrates GeoRSS data, provides tools to evaluate the impact of infrastructure projects on-line and to derive data from digital elevation models, among others.

As part of a project advanced by CAF and the Dartmouth Flood Observatory of the University of Colorado, daily regional flood maps in near-real-time and historical maps of flood are being incorporated to the viewer. Also, a system to estimate daily river flow in more than 2,000 river points in the region is being implemented using remote sensing techniques.

Institutions such as the World Bank, the Inter-American Development Bank, the Andean Community, the World Resources Institute, Nature Serve, Conservation International, NASA, the USGS, Woods Hole, the University of Colorado, the University of Buffalo, the University of Maryland, Guyra Paraguay, the United States Agency for International Development (USAID), the Department of the Interior in the US, the US Forest Service, the Lincoln Institute, and the geographic institutes of Mesoamerica have contributed regional spatial data which is available at the Regional Map Service.

To date, the viewer has more than 700 regional maps, among which the following stand out:

- near-real-time daily flood maps and historic flood maps of Colorado University,
- biodiversity data from the North Andean area of the Nature Serve,
- coral reef maps of the Caribbean islands from the World Resources
- maps of Central American ecosystems from the World Bank and of Andean ecosystems from the Andean Community,
- mangrove maps of South America of the USGS.
- biomass and height of forest tree tops data from NASA,
- monthly deforestation maps of the Gran Chaco Americano,
- Change in forest cover from 2000 to 2010 in the region,
- Land use/cover of Latin America from the European Spatial Agency,
- climate maps from Worldclim,
- hydropower potential of selected regions of South America,
- geology maps of South America from the OneGeology initiative,
- maps of mineral resources and flood maps from the USGS,
- and land use/cover maps for the Caribbean islands.

=== 3. The Regional Topographic Processing Service ===
GeoSUR developed a free access Topographic Processing Service (TPS) which is available on the web and allows for the generation of data derived from digital elevation models (DEMs) of Latin America and the Caribbean. Users may execute the computer models available in this service by using a varied set of DEMs with 1 km., and 500, 250, 90, and 30 meter resolutions. The models available in the TPS include: elevation profile, classification of slopes, watershed delineation, shaded relief, elevation classifications, aspect, viewshed analysis, dam flood areas and rain drop, among others. Users may select and download the DEM of any area of interest in Latin America and the Caribbean (with the exception of the 30 meter DEM) from the TPS.

EROS filled the information gaps of the DEM generated by the Shuttle Radar Topography Mission (SRTM, resolution: 30 meters) with ASTER, GDEM and GTOPO30 data for all the Latin American and Caribbean region, and created derived and consistent maps for the region which include shaded relief, slope, and aspect, and which may be visualized and downloaded from the Regional Maps Service.

Access to the SRTM 30-meter DEM of Latin America and the Caribbean has allowed CAF, with the support of CAF's Energy Program and some ministries of energy, to carry out detailed assessments of the hydroelectric potential of the State of São Paulo, Peru and Bolivia (the power potential of each 1 km. segment of river is calculated).

=== 4. The geoservices network operated by participating institutions ===
The Regional Map Service described above basically contains regional information. The national and local geospatial information for the region is available through a decentralized network of map services operated by participating institutions, where each institution is committed to the development of map services and metadata catalogues under the standards of the Open Geospatial Consortium (OGC). The participants act as data editors and have accounts in the GeoSUR Portal which allows them to register and manage their geoservices.

The participating institutions have the liberty to choose the hardware and software platforms to share data with the Network, under the condition that they use regionally recognized standards.

Currently, the GeoSUR Portal offers access to more than 100 viewers, more than 350 WMS services, and more than 40 WFS services. It offers access to more than 10,000 digital maps available in geoservices operated by participating institutions. GeoSUR offers capacity-building, technical assistance, and support to the institutions that are planning - or in the process of developing - their geoservices, and also helps stage some of them to the Cloud.

=== 5. The Regional Portal in ArcGIS Online ===
During 2013, it was decided to complement the information and services offered in the GeoSUR Portal by launching a Regional Portal based on ESRI's ArcGIS Online. Through this Portal, access is offered to part of the information included in the www.geosur.info Portal in a more user friendly platform.

== Participating institutions ==
Countries	Participating Institutions
Argentina	National Geographic Institute; Ministry of Agriculture
Belize	Land Information Center
Bolivia	GeoBolivia; National Geographic Institute; National Statistics Institute; Santa Cruz Department; Ministry of Hydrocarbons and Energy
Brazil	Brazilian Institute of Geography and Statistics; Ministry of the Environment; MundoGeo; National Institute for Space Research; Energy Secretariat of São Paulo; Amazon Socioenvironmental Georeferenced Information Network; Socio-Environmental Institute
Chile	National Geographic Institute; Ministry of the Environment; Ministry of Public Works; Natural Resources Information Center; Regional Government, Los Rios Province; National System of Land Information (SNIT)
Colombia	Geographic Institute Agustín Codazzi; Ministry of Environment and Sustainable Development; Institute of Hydrology, Meteorology and Environmental Studies; International Center for Tropical Agriculture; Mayor of Santiago de Cali; Mayor of Bogotá; Alexander von Humboldt Biological Resources Research Institute; Technological University of Pereira; Ministry of Transport; National Roads Institute (INVIAS); Special Administrative Unit of the Cadastral Office, Coordinator of the Spatial Data Infrastructure of Bogotá
Costa Rica	National Geographic Institute; Ministry of Environment, Energy and Telecommunications; National Institute of Statistics and Census of Costa Rica; Programa de Regularización de Catastro
Dominican Republic	Ministry of Environment and Natural Resources
Ecuador	National Geographic Institute; Centro de Levantamientos Integrados de Recursos Naturales por Sensores Remotos (Center for Integrated Survey of Natural Resources by Remote Sensing) (CLIRSEN); Ministry of Environment; University of El Azuay; National Electricity Council
El Salvador	National Geographic Institute; Viceministry of Housing and Urban Planning
Guatemala	National Geographic Institute; Ministry of Environment and Natural Resources; Planning and Programming Secretariat; Ministry of Planning
Honduras	Office of Geography and Cadastre
Jamaica	Land Information Council; Water Resources Authority
Mexico	National Institute of Statistics and Geography (INEGI)
Nicaragua	Nicaraguan Institute of Land Studies (INETER); Ministry of Agriculture and Forestry (MAGFOR)
Panama	Tommy Guardia Geographic Institute; Ministry of Environment; Statistics and Census Institutes
Paraguay	National Geographic Institute (Paraguay); Environment Secretariat; Ministry of Public Works (Paraguay); Guyra Paraguay
Peru	National Geographic Institute; Ministry of Environment; Geology and Mining Institute; Ministry of Energy and Mines
Trinidad and Tobago	Surveys and Mapping Division; Institute of Marine Affairs; Land and Surveys Division
Uruguay	National Geographic Institute; Ministry of Housing, Spatial Planning and Environment; Municipality of Montevideo; Agency for E-government; Institute of the Environment; National Disaster Prevention System
Venezuela	Simon Bolivar Geographic Institute; Venezuelan Institute for Scientific Research (IVIC); SIGIS Company; Governor of Miranda; Center for Digital Image Processing (CPDI); Cartogeo
Regional agencies	Inter-American Development Bank (IADB); Global Geospatial Information Management (GGIM Américas); Andean Community; EU Joint Research Center (INSPIRE); United Nations Environment Programme; University of Colorado; University of Buffalo; NASA; University of Twente; USAID; NatureServe; The Nature Conservancy; University of the West Indies

== The GeoSUR Award ==
The GeoSUR Award is granted annually and recognizes the application of spatial data and the development of geospatial information services which, due to their innovative and relevant characteristics, contribute to the fulfillment of the general objectives of the GeoSUR Program and promote the use of geographic information for decision making in Latin America and the Caribbean. Institutions or individuals from any country in the region may apply for the award. The bases of the award are announced at the beginning of each year in the PAIGH and GeoSUR websites.

The GeoSUR 2012 Award for innovation was granted to the Project for the Integration of geospatial Data for Mesoamerica, presented by the National Geographic and Land Registry Institute of El Salvador; while that year's award for relevance corresponded to the Geoserver of the Ministry of the Environment of Peru.

The GeoSUR 2013 Award was granted to the Project “Terra-i, a system that monitors natural vegetation change in Latin America and the Caribbean in real time, presented by the International Center for Tropical Agriculture (CIAT). Two projects were awarded honorable mention: the “Computer platform for the development of motoring, analysis, and alert systems for environmental extremes”, presented by the National Institute for Spatial Research (INPE) in Brazil, and the “Registry System for Geographic Items” presented by the Spatial Data Infrastructure for Bogota (IDECA).
