= The National Map =

USGS topographical information

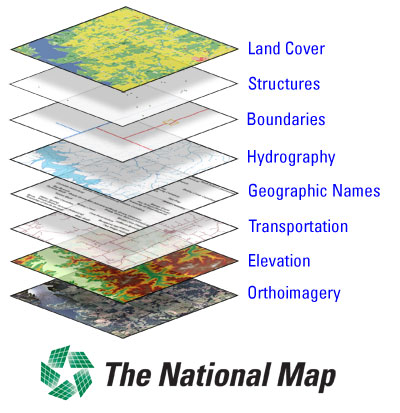
USGS image showing layers of The National Map

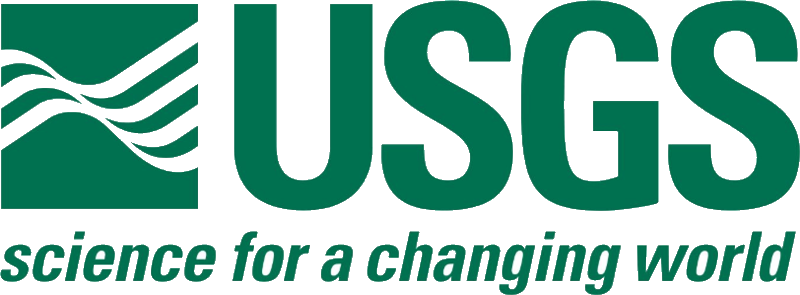
USGS logo

The National Map is a collaborative effort of the United States Geological Survey (USGS) and other federal, state, and local agencies to improve and deliver topographic information for the United States. The purpose of the effort is to provide "...a seamless, continuously maintained set of public domain geographic base information that will serve as a foundation for integrating, sharing, and using other data easily and consistently".

The National Map is part of the USGS National Geospatial Program. The geographic information available includes orthoimagery (aerial photographs), elevation, geographic names, hydrography, boundaries, transportation, structures and land cover. The National Map is accessible via the Web, as products and services, and as downloadable data. Its uses range from recreation to scientific analysis to emergency response.

The National Map is a significant contribution to the U.S. National Spatial Data Infrastructure (NSDI) from the Federal Geographic Data Committee (FGDC) and currently is being transformed to better serve the geospatial community by providing high quality, integrated geospatial data and improved products and services including new generation digital topographic maps. In addition, the National Map is foundational to implementation of the U.S. Department of the Interior (DOI) Geospatial Modernization Blueprint.

The USGS also utilizes data from The National Map Corps, which consists of volunteers who devote some of their time to provide cartographic information on structures.

The National Map is the official replacement for the USGS topographic map program.

== The National Map Corps ==
The National Map Corps consists of volunteers who devote some of their time to provide cartographic information to the U.S. Geological Survey. The only requirements to participate are having access to the Internet and a current familiarity with the area being mapped. This data is used to update The National Map.

The program originally allowed volunteers to collect geographic coordinates (latitude and longitude) via GPS receivers. The data was entered in spreadsheet format or in ESRI shapefiles and submitted via e-mail to the USGS National Geospatial Technical Operations Center(s) in Denver, Colorado, and Rolla, Missouri. During the registration process, prospective volunteers submitted a list of the 7.5 minute quadrangle maps on which they wished to work. Once accepted into the project, volunteers received their assignment and 1:24,000 scale topographic map of their quad. While there was no deadline for completing maps, the project's administrators preferred volunteers to submit coordinates for all structures in the quad no more than one year after beginning work.

In December 2006, a new Internet-based method for submitting information on structures was introduced. Using a web browser, volunteers are able to navigate maps and aerial photography, placing a point on the map and subsequently entering the name and type of structure.

From August 2008, the program stopped accepting structure data collected via GPS, but continued to use the web-based collection site.

=== Types of structures mapped ===
The following is a list of structures that can be entered on the web site. The focus is significant man-made structures. The "other" category is for man-made structures not on this list and should not include locations such as homes, restaurants or other commercial establishments.

- Education
  - School
  - College/University
- Emergency Response and Law Enforcement
  - Fire Station/EMS Station
  - Law Enforcement
  - Hospital
  - Ambulance Service
  - Correctional Facility
- Government and Military
  - State Capitol
- Mail and Shipping
  - Post Office
- Public Attractions and Landmark Buildings
  - Cemetery

== See also ==
- Microsoft Research Maps (formerly TerraServer-USA)
- National Elevation Dataset
