= NatCarb =

Geoportal on carbon sequestration

The NatCarb geoportal provides access to geospatial information and tools concerning carbon sequestration in the United States.
