= Pål Wessel =

Norwegian geologist (1959–2024)

- Born: August 31, 1959; Sarpsborg, Norway
- Died: March 26, 2024 (aged 64); Nittedal, Norway
- Other name: Paul Wessel
- Education: University of Oslo; Columbia University
- Known for: Generic Mapping Tools (GMT)
- Spouse: Jill Wessel
- Children: 2
- Scientific career
- Fields: Geoscience

Pål Wessel (August 31, 1959 – March 26, 2024) pronounced as, and also known as Paul Wessel, was a professor of the Department of Geology and Geophysics at the School of Ocean and Earth Science and Technology (SOEST) at the University of Hawaiʻi at Mānoa. He taught as a visiting professor at Sydney University in Australia and University of Oslo in Norway. Wessel was a Fellow of the Geological Society of America.

== Open source mapping tools and data ==
In the 1980s, Wessel and Walter H. F. Smith created Generic Mapping Tools (GMT), an open-source collection of computer software tools for processing and displaying geographic and Cartesian datasets. They later supplemented this with the Global Self-consistent, Hierarchical, High-resolution Shoreline Database (GSHHS) that they constructed from two public domain data sets, the World Data Bank II (WDB), also known as CIA Data Bank, and the World Vector Shoreline (WVS) data set.

== Geological and geophysical research ==
Areas in which Wessel conducted research included:

- Periodic co-pulsing of volcanic hot spots, including Hawaii, Yellowstone, Iceland, Easter Island, La Réunion, Tristan, the Galápagos, Samoa, Ontong Java, Tasmantid, the Society Islands, the Azores, Madeira, Canary Islands, Cape Verde Islands, St. Helena, Afar-Kenya, and others
- Plate Tectonic Reconstructions and Hot Spot Fixity
- Improvement of marine geophysical data sets via data analysis
- Thermo-mechanical Evolution and Properties of Oceanic Lithosphere
- Flexural Deformation of Lithosphere at Seamounts, Fracture Zones, and Trenches

== See also ==
- Generic Mapping Tools
- GSHHS
- Hawaii hotspot
