= General Bathymetric Chart of the Oceans =

Publicly available bathymetric chart of the world's oceans

One plate from a 1905 printing of the General Bathymetric Chart of the Oceans (French: Carte générale bathymétrique des océans)

The General Bathymetric Chart of the Oceans (GEBCO) is a publicly available bathymetric chart of the world's oceans. The project was conceived with the aim of preparing a global series of charts showing the general shape of the seafloor. Over the years it has become a reference map of the bathymetry of the world's oceans for scientists and others.

== Organisation ==
GEBCO operates under the joint auspices of the International Hydrographic Organization (IHO). and the Intergovernmental Oceanographic Commission (IOC) of UNESCO. Its work is done by an international group of experts in seafloor mapping who develop a range of bathymetric data sets and data products.

== Data sets and products ==
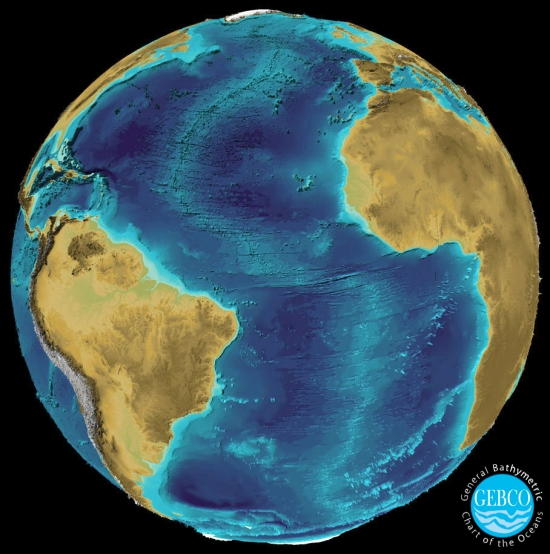
Atlantic Ocean 3D visualization

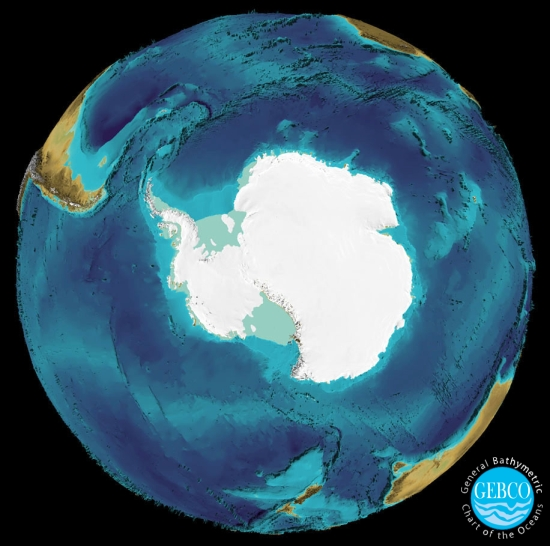
Antarctic Ocean 3D visualization

Although originally GEBCO published paper contour charts, today it has moved into the digital age and collects digital depths of the ocean from wherever they are available. GEBCO provides a range of bathymetric data sets and data products, including:

- Global gridded bathymetric data sets:
  - GEBCO_08 Grid – a global bathymetric grid with 30 arc-second spacing, generated by combining quality-controlled ship depth soundings with interpolation between sounding points guided by satellite-derived gravity data.
  - GEBCO_2014 Grid – an update to the previously released GEBCO_08 Grid.
  - GEBCO_2019 Grid – an update to the previously released GEBCO_2014 Grid with 15 arc-second resolution.
  - GEBCO One Minute Grid – a global grid at one arc-minute intervals, based largely on the most recent set of bathymetric contours contained within the GEBCO Digital Atlas.

The grids are available to download from the British Oceanographic Data Centre (BODC) in the form of netCDF files, along with free software for displaying and accessing data in ASCII and netCDF. The grids can be used with the Generic Mapping Tools (GMT) system.

- The GEBCO Digital Atlas – a two volume CDROM set which contains:
  - The GEBCO One Minute Grid
  - A global set of digital bathymetric contours and coastlines
  - The GEBCO Gazetteer of Undersea Feature Names: a digital gazetteer of undersea feature names.
  - A software interface for viewing and accessing the data sets
- The GEBCO Gazetteer of Undersea Feature Names – a digital gazetteer of undersea feature names used on sheets and products of GEBCO and Regional International Bathymetric Charts (IBC) projects, and on international (INT) nautical charts. It is available to be downloaded from the International Hydrographic Organization (IHO).
- The GEBCO world map – a global, coloured, paper map of the bathymetry of the world's oceans based upon the GEBCO One Minute Grid. The map is available to be downloaded in the form of JPEG file.

== Project history ==
The GEBCO chart series was initiated in 1903 by an international group of geographers and oceanographers, under the leadership of Prince Albert I of Monaco. At that time there was an explosion of interest in the study of the natural world and this group recognized the importance of a set of maps describing the shape of the ocean floor. The first hundred years of the project were described in the book The History of GEBCO 1903–2003 published by GITC in 2003. Nowadays GEBCO's role has become increasingly important, due to the increased interest in the oceans for scientific research and for the exploitation and conservation of resources.

Since 1903, five separate editions of paper, bathymetric contour charts covering the whole world have been produced. GEBCO is now maintained in digital form as the GEBCO Digital Atlas.

== Training ==
The Nippon Foundation of Japan has provided funding for GEBCO to train a new generation of scientists and hydrographers in ocean bathymetry. The 12-month course, leading to a Postgraduate Certificate in Ocean Bathymetry (PCOB), has been held at the University of New Hampshire, US, since 2004. 60 GEBCO scholars from 31 different countries have completed the course and are supporting GEBCO programs.

== Seabed 2030 Project ==
The Nippon Foundation-GEBCO Seabed 2030 Project, which aims to motivate a number of collaborators to create a full map of the ocean floor, was launched in 2016. There are four Seabed 2030 centres, which coordinate mapping activities in different regions, gather and compile the bathymetric information, and partner with existing mapping activities within their regions. The Seabed 2030 Global Center is responsible for "producing and delivering global GEBCO products".

GEBCO is the only intergovernmental body with a mandate to map the whole ocean floor. At the beginning of the project, only 6 per cent of the world's ocean bottom had been surveyed to today's standards; as of June 2025, the project had recorded 27.3 per cent mapped. About 14,500,000 square kilometres (5,600,000 sq mi) of new bathymetric data was included in the GEBCO grid in 2019, and an additional area equivalent to the size of Europe between 2020 and 2022. Seabed 2030 initially aimed at using a global 100m grid, but this has been updated to use a variable resolution grid, with larger squares over deep ocean floor and smaller ones in shallow waters.

Governments, institutions and companies have been contributing to the effort, and Seabed 2030 is crowdsourcing information from any party that is able to contribute, including small boats. The British Antarctic Survey is assisting the effort by varying the routes of its boats in order to map different parts of the sea floor.
