= Spatial data infrastructure =

A spatial data infrastructure (SDI), also called geospatial data infrastructure, is a data infrastructure implementing a framework of geographic data, metadata, users and tools that are interactively connected in order to use spatial data in an efficient and flexible way. Another definition is "the technology, policies, standards, human resources, and related activities necessary to acquire, process, distribute, use, maintain, and preserve spatial data". Most commonly, institutions with large repositories of geographic data (especially government agencies) create SDIs to facilitate the sharing of their data with a broader audience.

A further definition is given in Kuhn (2005): "An SDI is a coordinated series of agreements on technology standards, institutional arrangements, and policies that enable the discovery and use of geospatial information by users and for purposes other than those it was created for."

== General ==
Some of the main principles are that data and metadata should not be managed centrally, but by the data originator and/or owner, and that tools and services connect via computer networks to the various sources. A GIS is often the platform for deploying an individual node within an SDI. To achieve these objectives, good coordination between all the actors is necessary and the definition of standards is very important.

The original example of an SDI is the United States National Spatial Data Infrastructure (NSDI), first mandated in the OMB Circular A-16 in 1996. In Europe since 2007, INSPIRE is a European Commission initiative to build a European SDI beyond national boundaries; the United Nations Spatial Data Infrastructure (UNSDI) plans to do the same for over 30 UN Funds, Programs, Specialized Agencies and member countries.

== Software components ==
An SDI should enable the discovery and delivery of spatial data from a data repository, via a spatial service provider, to a user. As mentioned earlier it is often wished that the data provider is able to update spatial data stored in a repository. Hence, the basic software components of an SDI are:

- Software client - to display, query, and analyse spatial data (this could be a browser or a desktop GIS)
- Catalogue service - for the discovery, browsing, and querying of metadata or spatial services, spatial datasets and other resources
- Spatial data service - allowing the delivery of the data via the Internet
- Processing services - such as datum and projection transformations, or the transformation of cadastral survey observations and owner requests into Cadastral documentation
- (Spatial) data repository - to store data, e.g., a spatial database
- GIS software (client or desktop) - to create and update spatial data

Besides these software components, a range of (international) technical standards are necessary that allow interaction between the different software components. Among those are geospatial standards defined by the Open Geospatial Consortium (e.g., OGC WMS, WFS, GML, etc.) and ISO (e.g., ISO 19115) for the delivery of maps, vector and raster data, but also data format and internet transfer standards by W3C consortium.

== National spatial data infrastructures ==
List by country or administrative zone. It is not complete, is a sample of National Spatial Data Infrastructure (NSDI) official websites.

Admin. Region	NSDI name and ext. link
United Nations	United Nations Spatial Data Infrastructure
Argentina	Spatial Data Infrastructure of Argentinian Republic (IDERA)
Australia	Australian Spatial Data Infrastructure and its centre
Bogotá	Bogotá Spatial Data Infrastructure
Bolivia	Bolivia Spatial Data Infraestructure (IDE-EPB)
Brazil	Brazilian Spatial Data Infrastructure (INDE)
Canada	Canadian Geospatial Data Infrastructure
Chile	Chilean Spatial Data Infrastructure and Blog
Colombia	Colombian Spatial Data Infrastructure (ICDE)
Costa Rica	National Service of Territory Information
United States	U.S. National Spatial Data Infrastructure
Europe	The European INSPIRE initiative
Andorra	Andorran Spatial Data Infrastructure (IDEAnd)
Estonia	Estonian National Spatial Data Infrastructure
Finland	Finnish National Spatial Data Infrastructure
Germany	German National Spatial Data Infrastructure
Hong Kong	Common Spatial Data Infrastructure (CSDI)
Lithuania	Lithuanian geographic information infrastructure
Netherlands	Dutch Geo register
Spain	Spanish National Spatial Data Infrastructure (IDEE)
Andalusia	Andalusian Spatial Data Infrastructure
Basque Country	Spatial Data Infrastructure and Portal of the Basque Country. geoEuskadi
Canary Islands	Canary Islands Spatial Data Infrastructure (IDECanarias)
Catalonia	Catalonia Spatial Data Infrastructure
Gipuzkoa	Gipuzkoa Spatial Data Infrastructure
Sweden	Geodata.se
Switzerland	Swiss Federal Spatial Data Infrastructure
Abu Dhabi	Abu Dhabi SDI
India	National Spatial Data Infrastructure (NSDI)
Indonesia	Ina-Geoportal
Malaysia	Malaysia Geospatial Data Infrastructure (MyGDI)

== See also ==
- GeoSUR
- GEOSS
- GMES
- INSPIRE
- UNSDI
- GIS file formats
- GIS software
- International Cartographic Association (ICA)
- ArcGIS
- Geographic information system (GIS)
