= GSHHG =

High-resolution shoreline data set

Semi-transparent orthographic projection, centered on 40° N, 40° W, using shoreline data from GSHHG ("crude level")

GSHHG (Global Self-consistent, Hierarchical, High-resolution Geography Database; formerly Global Self-consistent, Hierarchical, High-resolution Shoreline Database (GSHHS)) is a high-resolution shoreline data set amalgamated from two data bases (the CIA world database WDBII, and the World Vector Shoreline database) in the public domain. The data have undergone extensive processing and are free of internal inconsistencies such as erratic points and crossing segments. The shorelines are constructed entirely from hierarchically arranged closed polygons. The four-level hierarchy is as follows: seashore, lakes, islands within lakes, ponds within islands within lakes. (The largest such 'pond' is Lake Manitou, over 100 sq km in area, which itself contains several small islands presumably not in the database.)

The data can be used to simplify data searches and data selections, or to study the statistical characteristics of shorelines and land-masses. It comes with access software and routines to facilitate decimation based on a standard line-reduction algorithm.

GSHHS is developed and maintained by Dr. Paul Wessel at the University of Hawaiʻi, and Dr. Walter H. F. Smith at the NOAA Laboratory for Satellite Altimetry.

== See also ==
- Vector Map, a vector based collection of GIS data covering the earth
