= United Nations Spatial Data Infrastructure =

Mechanism for exchanging geospatial data

The United Nations Spatial Data Infrastructure (UNSDI) is an institutional and technical mechanism for establishing system coherence for the exchange and applications of geospatial data and information for UN activities and supporting SDI (Spatial Data Infrastructure) development activities in Member Countries.

== Background ==
The United Nations Spatial Data Infrastructure (UNSDI) was an initiative of the United Nations Geographic Information Working Group (UNGIWG), a voluntary network of UN professionals engaged in cartography and geographic information science.

The initiative aimed to contribute to the mission of the United Nations, from peacekeeping and humanitarian relief to climate change mitigation, disaster reduction, and recovery. It also sought to support environmental protection, poverty alleviation, food security, water management, and economic development, thereby advancing the United Nations Millennium Development Goals (MDGs). By facilitating efficient global and local access to, exchange of, and use of geospatial information, UNSDI sought to make the UN system more effective and to reinforce its “Delivering as One” approach.

Spatial Data Infrastructures (SDIs) provide the institutional and technical foundations, including policies, standards, and procedures that enable organizations and systems to interact efficiently, facilitating the discovery, evaluation, and application of spatial data.

Given the varying capacities of UN agencies in utilizing and managing geospatial information, over 30 organizations participating in the drafting of the UNSDI strategy document (through UNGIWG) anticipated that the initiative would help reduce development and operational costs. This would be achieved by fostering collaboration, establishing common standards, and developing shared guidelines and implementation tools. The participating organizations considered the development of UNSDI essential for improving coherence across the UN system in the use and exchange of geospatial data and information for operational activities.

In the short term, UNSDI was envisioned as an investment in the capacity of the United Nations system to manage its existing geospatial assets more effectively. It was also intended to serve as a model for capacity building in Member States seeking UN assistance in managing and applying geospatial information to support national development goals.

== Development at global level ==
A Center of Excellence for UNSDI was established to support the development of the initiative. The first planned phase focused on the creation of a Gazetteer, a Geospatial Data Warehouse, and a Visualization Facility. Two donor countries, Australia and Germany, were initially involved in these efforts: Australia had intended to fund the Gazetteer project, while Germany provided office space and staffing resources for the UNSDI Center of Excellence in Bonn. A proposal for funding the Geospatial Data Warehouse and related activities was to be submitted to the Netherlands in the fourth quarter of 2012. However, no funding was ultimately provided for any of these activities, and the process was halted while these developments were still underway.

== Development at regional level ==
The following Regional Organizations joined the process at the time:

- Regional Centre for Mapping of Resources for Development (RCMRD) in Nairobi, Kenya
- International Centre for Integrated Mountain Development (ICIMOD) in Kathmandu, Nauru, Nepal
- Regional Centre for Training in Aerospace Surveys (RECTAS) in Ile-Ife, Nigeria.

== Development at national level ==
Underlying the UNSDI was the need to link the initiative with national public and private geospatial and SDI capacities, in both developed and developing countries. National Coordination Offices (NCOs) for UNSDI were therefore to be established, and the countries in which NCOs had been created were the Netherlands, the Czech Republic and Hungary.

Discussions on participation in UNSDI were ongoing with the following countries: Australia, Austria, Brazil, Cape Verde, Chile, Jamaica, India, Japan, Mexico, Morocco, Mongolia, Nigeria, Spain, and South Africa.

== Documents ==
15 key documents on the UNSDI initiative can be found at and downloaded HERE

Among them:

- Interim UNSDI Framework
- UNSDI Compendium
- UNSDI Draft Governance Framework
- UNSDI Strategy Implementation Plan

== Podcasts on Spotify ==
- Why UNSDI Wasn't Continued: The Untold History of UN Geospatial Reform
- Deep Dive on UNSDI
- UNSDI Strategy Implementation
- UNGGIM and UNSDI - Roles and Relationships in Global Geospatial Management

== Status UNSDI ==
Not continued by the UN.
