= Pan American Institute of Geography and History =

Academic institute

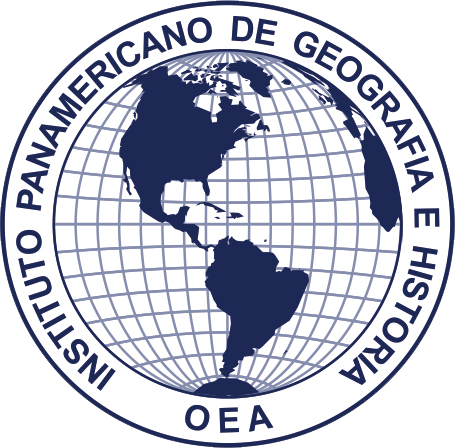
Logo of the Pan American Institute of Geography and History

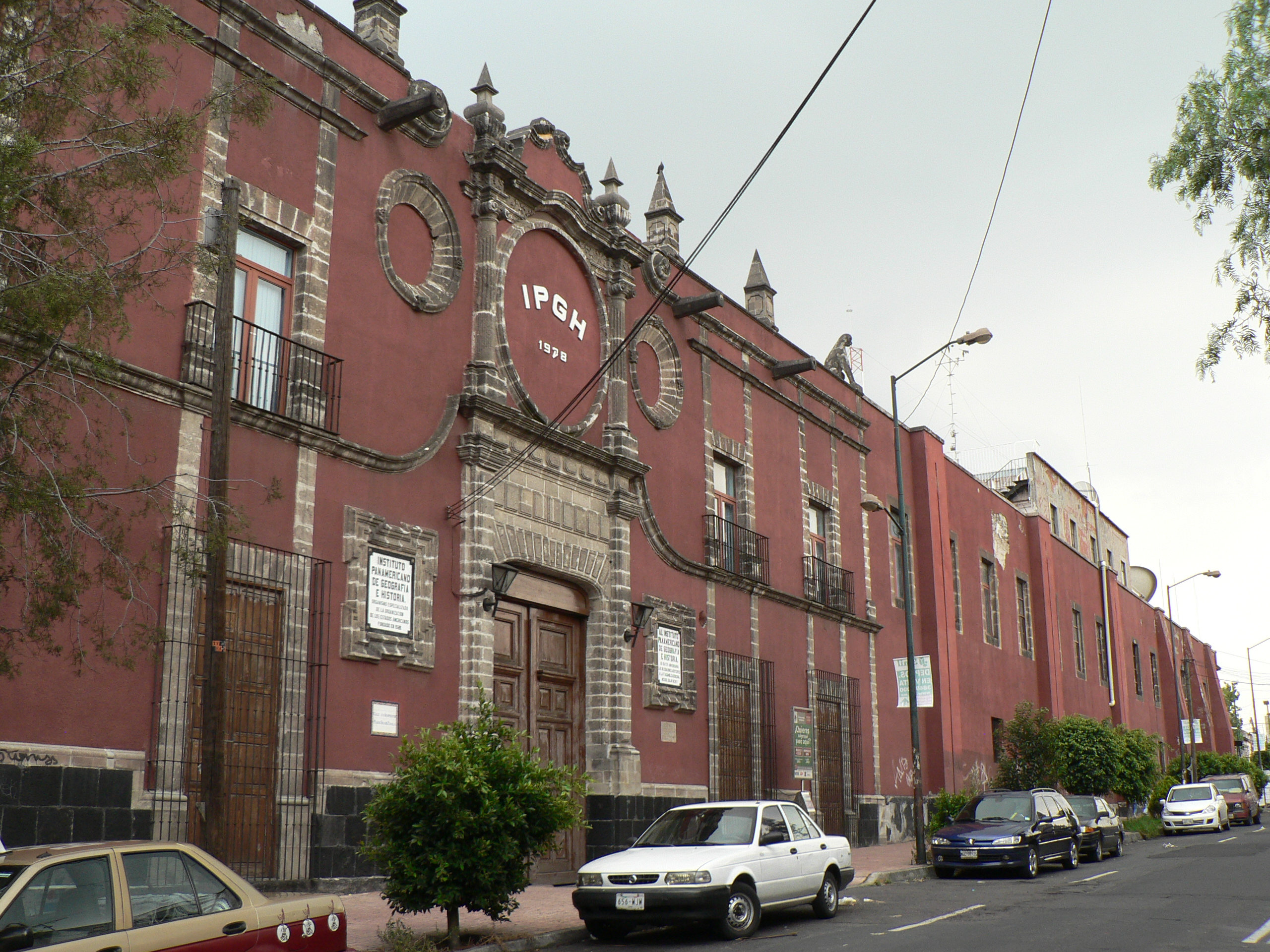
Headquarters in Mexico City

The Pan American Institute of Geography and History (PAIGH, Spanish: Instituto Panamericano de Geografía e Historia - IPGH) is an international organisation dedicated to the generation and transference of knowledge specialized in the fields of cartography, geography, history and geophysics.

The institute was created on February 7, 1928, during a conference held in Havana. The city that was established to be the host was Mexico City. The Institute signed an agreement with the Organization of American States and became a specialized organization of the OAS; in 1974 this agreement was modified and signed.

== Member states ==
The PAIAGH has 20 member states:

- Argentina
- Belize
- Bolivia
- Brazil
- Chile
- Colombia
- Costa Rica
- Ecuador
- El Salvador
- Guatemala
- Haiti
- Honduras
- Mexico
- Nicaragua
- Panama
- Paraguay
- Peru
- Dominican Republic
- Uruguay
- Venezuela

=== Former member states ===
- United States

== Publications ==
PAIGH publishes the following academic journals:

Biannual publications

- Revista Cartográfica
- Revista Geográfica
- Revista de Historia de América
- Revista Geofísica

Annual publications

- Boletín de Antropología Americana
- Revista de Arqueología Americana y Folklore Americano
