= Generic Mapping Tools =

Collection of computer software tools

- Original authors: Paul Wessel and Walter H. F. Smith
- Developers: Wessel, Smith and volunteers
- Initial release: 1988
- Stable release: 6.6.0 / 26 July 2025; 6 months ago
- Written in: C, C++
- Operating system: Unix-like, Mac OS and Windows
- Type: Map generator
- License: GNU Lesser General Public License
- Website: www.generic-mapping-tools.org
- Repository: github.com/GenericMappingTools/gmt

Generic Mapping Tools (GMT) are an open-source collection of computer software tools for processing and displaying xy and xyz datasets, including rasterization, filtering and other image processing operations, and various kinds of map projections. The software stores 2-D grids as COARDS-compliant netCDF files and comes with a comprehensive collection of free GIS data, such as coast lines, rivers, political borders and coordinates of other geographic objects. Users convert further data (like satellite imagery and digital elevation models) from other sources and import them. GMT stores the resulting maps and diagrams in PostScript (PS) or Encapsulated PostScript (EPS) format.

Users operate the system from the command line: this enables scripting and the automation of routine tasks. More or less comprehensive graphic user interfaces are available from third parties, as well as web applications, bringing the system's functionality online.

Paul Wessel and Walter H. F. Smith created GMT in the 1980s at Lamont–Doherty Earth Observatory, officially releasing it on October 7, 1991 under the GNU General Public License. The letters GMT originally stood for Gravity, Magnetism and Topography, the three basic types of geophysical data. Besides its strong support for the visualization of geographic data sets, the software includes tools for processing and manipulating multi-dimensional datasets. GMT is most widely used by Earth and Ocean scientists.

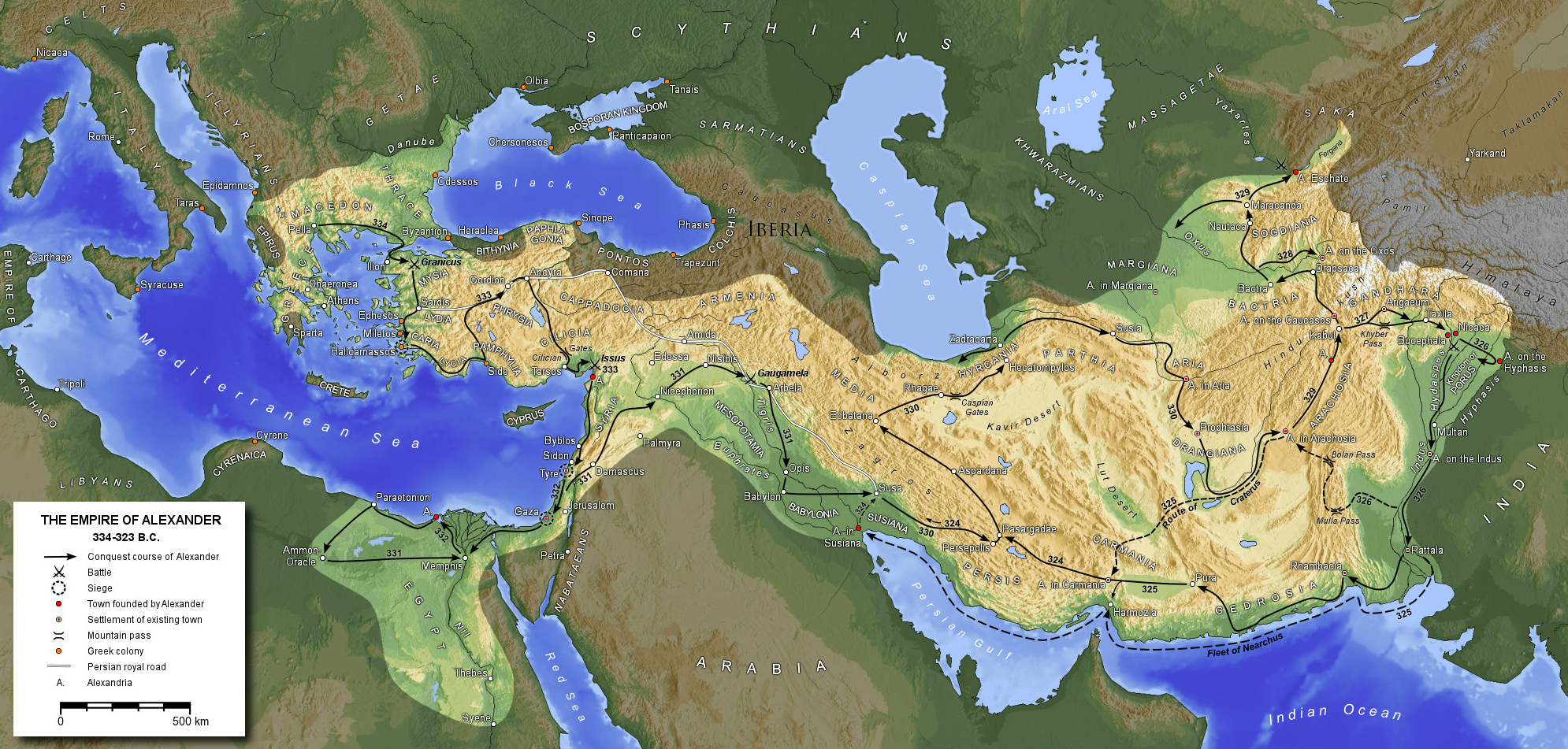
An example of a map created with GMT, illustrating the empire of Alexander the Great
