= Federal Geographic Data Committee =

United States government committee coordinating geospatial data

- FGDC

Agency overview
- Formed: 1990
- Headquarters: USGS National Center Reston, Virginia
- Agency executives: Timothy Petty (June 2020), Chairman; Suzette Kent (June 2020), Vice-Chair; Ivan Deloatch, Executive Director (June 2020)
- Website: www.fgdc.gov

The Federal Geographic Data Committee (FGDC) is a United States government committee which promotes the coordinated development, use, sharing, and dissemination of geospatial data on a national basis. Its 32 members are representatives from the Executive Office of the President, and Cabinet level and independent federal agencies. The secretary of the Department of the Interior chairs the FGDC, with the deputy director for management, Office of Management and Budget (OMB) as vice-chair.

== History ==
The FGDC's role was determined by OMB Circular A-16 and OMB Circular A-119 until 2018. Then the FGDC's official position and roles were codified in law in the Geospatial Data Act of 2018.

OMB Circular A-16, revised August 19, 2002, is a Government circular that was created by the United States Office of Management and Budget (OMB) to provide guidance for federal agencies that create, maintain or use spatial data directly or indirectly through the establishment of the National Spatial Data Infrastructure (NSDI) and the Federal Geographic Data Committee (FGDC).

The circular establishes guidelines for the management of digital spatial data and the use of those assets. It also appoints the FGDC to the interagency coordinating body for NSDI-related activities. The Secretary of the Interior is established as chair, with the Deputy Director for Management, OMB as Vice-Chair.

== U.S. National Spatial Data Infrastructure ==
The U.S. National Spatial Data Infrastructure (NSDI) ensures that spatial information is accurate and available to state, local, and tribal governments as well as to academia and the private sector. The NSDI obeys four primary values:

- Privacy and Security of raw and processed citizens' personal data and accuracy of statistical data
- Access to these data per guidelines subject to OMB Circular A-130
- Protection of proprietary interests to these data
- Interoperability between various federal agencies' information systems within these data

The NSDI supports the advancement for a Global Spatial Data Infrastructure that coincides with National Security interests. Any Federal system that develops international data in accordance with these systems must follow international voluntary standards as outlined by Circular A-119.

The NSDI has five parts:

- Data themes
- Metadata
- National Spatial Data Clearinghouse
- Technical standards
- Partnerships

== Mission and policy ==
The FGDC coordinates the sharing of geographic data, maps, and online services through an online portal, geodata.gov, that searches metadata held within the NSDI Clearinghouse Network.

Spatial Data is considered a national capital asset. The NSDI manages the distribution of these assets across all interconnected systems, federal and private sector, and analyzes it to determine the impact of the world economically, physically and socially upon the United States.

Part of NSDI's mission is to help avoid duplication or erroneous modification of this spatial data. Accurate and dependable spatial data allows NSDI to analyze current situational trends such as weather patterns, traffic congestions, and other various infrastructures to create a national snapshot in order to make predictions or projections based on these data.

Any agency that collects, produces, acquires, maintains, distributes, uses, or preserves any form of spatial data either directly or indirectly with any other agency or organization must follow the policies set forth by the circular.

The following exemplary list is representative of the kinds of systems to which the circular applies:

- the National Mapping Program
- the National Spatial Reference System
- the National Geologic Mapping Program
- the National Wetlands Inventory
- the National Cooperative Soil Survey Program
- the National Public Land Survey System
- Geographic Coordinate Database
- the National Oceanic and Atmospheric Administration (NOAA) nautical charting and nautical data collection and information programs
- the U.S. Army Corps of Engineers (USACE) inland waterway charting program
- the Offshore Minerals Program
- the NASA's Earth Science Enterprise
- the Federal Emergency Management Agency's Flood Plain Mapping program and other federal activities that involve national surveying, mapping, remote sensing, spatially referenced statistical data
- Global Positioning System (GPS)

There are few exemptions to adherence to the policy described in the circular:

- spatial data related to tribal governments not paid for with federal funds
- classified national-security related activities of the Department of Defense (DOD), unless declassified by Executive Order 12951 (under direction of the Secretary of Defense)
- those activities of the Department of Energy under determination of the Secretary of Energy
- intelligence spatial data activities, under determination of the Director of the Central Intelligence Agency

Every agency that uses NSDI information must adhere to a set of responsibilities as outlined by the circular.

On July 23, 2009, the Energy and Mineral Resources Subcommittee of the House Natural Resources Committee held an oversight hearing on federal geospatial data management. Rep. John Sarbanes of Maryland quoted a U.S. General Accounting Office (GAO) report from his briefing material saying that only 4 of the FGDC member agencies were in compliance.

== See also ==
- Geographic information system
- Spatial data infrastructure
