= Loxodromic =

Loxodromic may refer to:

- a loxodrome, see rhumb line
- a loxodromic transform, see Möbius transformation#Loxodromic transforms
- Loxodromic navigation, a method of navigation by following a rhumb line
