= Loxodromic navigation =

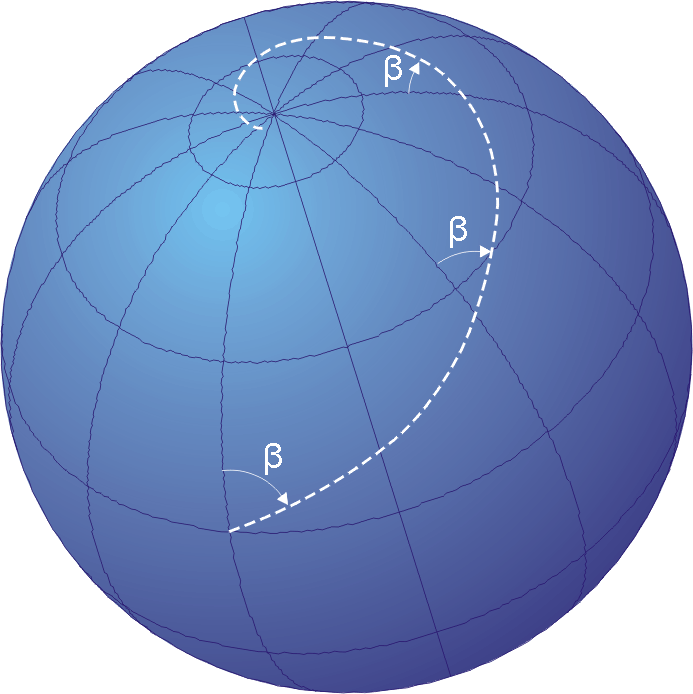
Rhumb line navigation path: β = constant

Loxodromic navigation (from Greek λοξóς, oblique, and δρóμος, path) is a method of navigation by following a rhumb line, a curve on the surface of the Earth that follows the same angle at the intersection with each meridian. This serves to maintain a steady course in sailing.

Navigating on a spherical surface with a fixed course ($\beta$ in the figure) results in a spiral path that approaches the North Pole for courses ranging from 270º to 090º and the South Pole for courses from 090º to 270º. On a nautical chart plotted according to the Mercator projection, a loxodromic course appears as a straight line.

== Comparison Chart ==
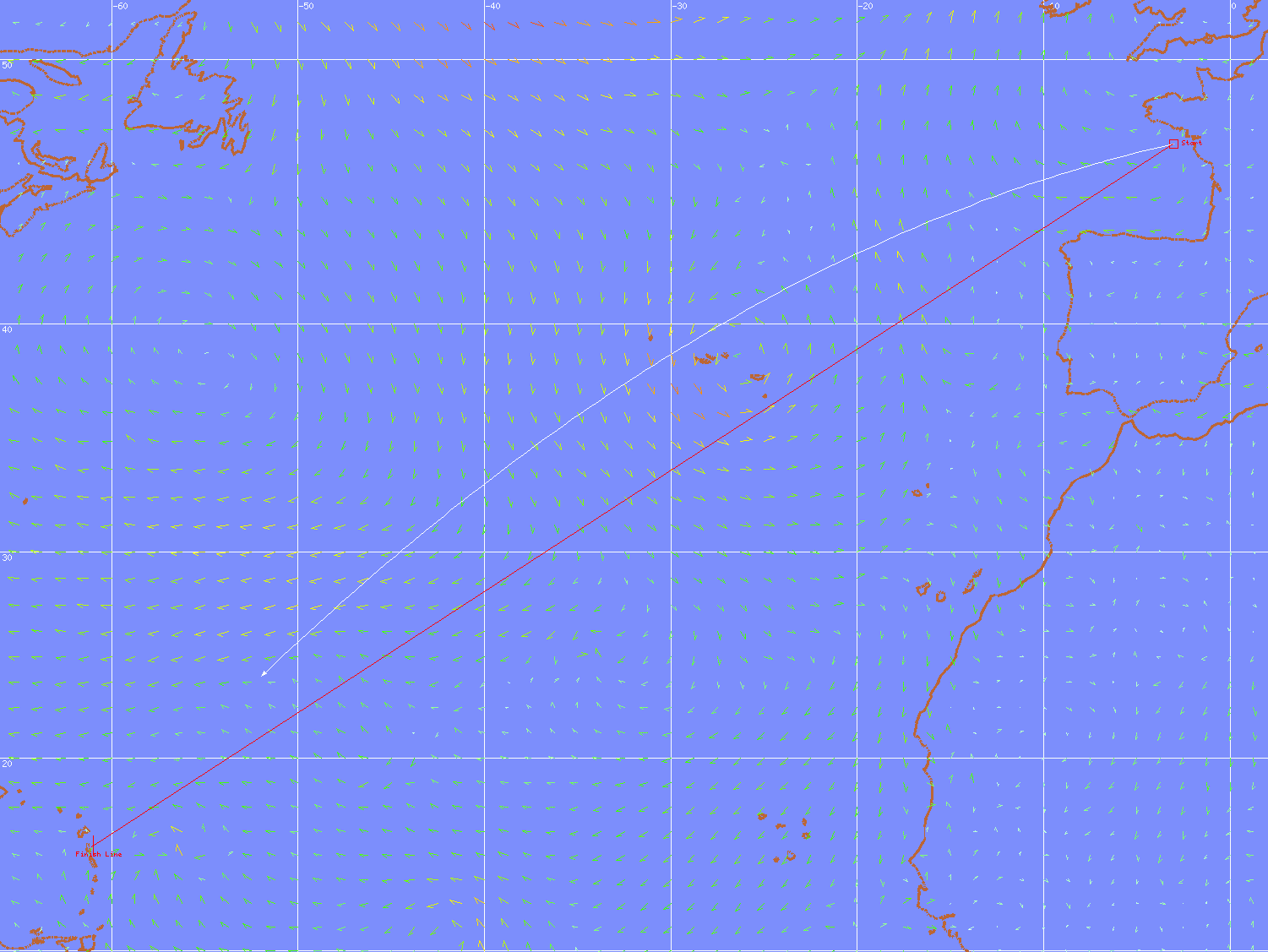
Comparison of orthodromic course (white) compared with a loxodromic course (red) in a map using Mercator projection.

== See also ==
- Great circle navigation
- Windrose network
- Map
- Portolan map
- Marine sandglass
- Compass rose
- Isoazimuthal
