= Great-circle navigation =

Flight or sailing route along the shortest path between two points on a globe's surface

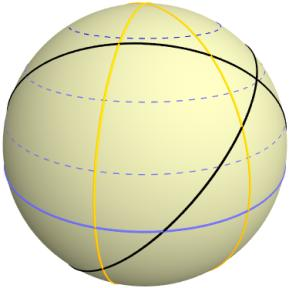
Orthodromic course drawn on the Earth globe

Great-circle navigation or orthodromic navigation (related to orthodromic course; from Ancient Greek ορθός (orthós) 'right angle' and δρόμος (drómos) 'path') is the practice of navigating a vessel (a ship or aircraft) along a great circle. Such routes yield the shortest distance between two points on the globe.

== Course ==
Figure 1. The great circle path between (φ_{1}, λ_{1}) and (φ_{2}, λ_{2}).

The great circle path may be found using spherical trigonometry; this is the spherical version of the inverse geodetic problem. If a navigator begins at P_{1} = (φ_{1}, λ_{1}) and plans to travel the great circle to a point at point P_{2} = (φ_{2}, λ_{2}) (see Fig. 1, φ is the latitude, positive northward, and λ is the longitude, positive eastward), the initial and final courses α_{1} and α_{2} are given by formulas for solving a spherical triangle
$$\begin{align}
\tan\alpha_1 &= \frac{\cos\phi_2\sin\lambda_{12}}{ \cos\phi_1 \sin\phi_2 - \sin\phi_1 \cos\phi_2 \cos\lambda_{12}},\\
\tan\alpha_2 &= \frac{\cos\phi_1\sin\lambda_{12}}{-\cos\phi_2 \sin\phi_1 + \sin\phi_2 \cos\phi_1 \cos\lambda_{12}},\\
\end{align}$$
where λ_{12} = λ_{2} − λ_{1} (Note: In the article on great-circle distances, the notation Δλ = λ_{12} and Δσ = σ_{12} is used. The notation in this article is needed to deal with differences between other points, e.g., λ_{01}.) and the quadrants of α_{1}, α_{2} are determined by the signs of the numerator and denominator in the tangent formulas (e.g., using the atan2 function).

The central angle between the two points, σ_{12}, is given by
$$\tan\sigma_{12}=\frac{\sqrt{(\cos\phi_1\sin\phi_2-\sin\phi_1\cos\phi_2\cos\lambda_{12})^2 + (\cos\phi_2\sin\lambda_{12})^2}}{\sin\phi_1\sin\phi_2+\cos\phi_1\cos\phi_2\cos\lambda_{12}}.$$
(Note: A simpler formula is $$\cos\sigma_{12}=\sin\phi_1\sin\phi_2+\cos\phi_1\cos\phi_2\cos\lambda_{12};$$ however, this is numerically less accurate if σ_{12} small.) (Note: These equations for α_{1}, α_{2}, σ_{12} are suitable for implementation on modern calculators and computers. For hand computations with logarithms, Delambre's analogies were usually used: $$\begin{align} \cos\tfrac12(\alpha_2+\alpha_1) \sin\tfrac12\sigma_{12} &= \sin\tfrac12(\phi_2-\phi_1) \cos\tfrac12\lambda_{12},\\ \sin\tfrac12(\alpha_2+\alpha_1) \sin\tfrac12\sigma_{12} &= \cos\tfrac12(\phi_2+\phi_1) \sin\tfrac12\lambda_{12},\\ \cos\tfrac12(\alpha_2-\alpha_1) \cos\tfrac12\sigma_{12} &= \cos\tfrac12(\phi_2-\phi_1) \cos\tfrac12\lambda_{12},\\ \sin\tfrac12(\alpha_2-\alpha_1) \cos\tfrac12\sigma_{12} &= \sin\tfrac12(\phi_2+\phi_1) \sin\tfrac12\lambda_{12}. \end{align}$$ McCaw refers to these equations as being in "logarithmic form", by which he means that all the trigonometric terms appear as products; this minimizes the number of table lookups required. Furthermore, the redundancy in these formulas serves as a check in hand calculations. If using these equations to determine the shorter path on the great circle, it is necessary to ensure that |λ_{12}| ≤ π (otherwise the longer path is found).) (The numerator of this formula contains the quantities that were used to determine tan α_{1}.)

The distance along the great circle will then be s_{12} = Rσ_{12}, where R is the assumed radius of the Earth and σ_{12} is expressed in radians. Using the mean Earth radius, R = R_{1} ≈ 6,371 km (3,959 mi) yields results for the distance s_{12} which are within 1% of the geodesic length for the WGS84 ellipsoid; see Geodesics on an ellipsoid for details.

=== Relation to geocentric coordinate system ===
The position angle of the point t at the point s is the angle at which the green and the dashed great circles intersect at s. The unit directions u_{E}, u_{N} and the rotation axis ω are marked by arrows.

Detailed evaluation of the optimum direction is possible if the sea surface is approximated by a sphere surface. The standard computation places the ship at a geodetic latitude φ_{s} and geodetic longitude λ_{s}, where φ is considered positive if north of the equator, and where λ is considered positive if east of Greenwich. In the geocentric coordinate system centered at the center of the sphere, the Cartesian components are
$${\mathbf s}=R\left(\begin{array}{c} \cos\varphi_s \cos\lambda_s \\
\cos\varphi_s \sin\lambda_s \\
\sin\varphi_s
\end{array}\right)$$
and the target position is
$${\mathbf t}=R\left(\begin{array}{c} \cos\varphi_t \cos\lambda_t \\
\cos\varphi_t \sin\lambda_t \\
\sin\varphi_t
\end{array}\right).$$
The North Pole is at
$${\mathbf N}=R\left(\begin{array}{c} 0 \\
0 \\
1
\end{array}\right).$$

The minimum distance d is the distance along a great circle that runs through s and t. It is calculated in a plane that contains the sphere center and the great circle,
$$d_{s,t}=R\theta_{s,t}$$
where θ is the angular distance of two points viewed from the center of the sphere, measured in radians. The cosine of the angle is calculated by the dot product of the two vectors
$$\mathbf{s}\cdot \mathbf{t} = R^2\cos \theta_{s,t} = R^2(\sin\varphi_s\sin\varphi_t+\cos\varphi_s\cos\varphi_t\cos(\lambda_t-\lambda_s))$$
If the ship steers straight to the North Pole, the travel distance is
$$d_{s,N} = R\theta_{s,N} = R(\pi/2-\varphi_s)$$
If a ship starts at t and sails straight to the North Pole, the travel distance is
$$d_{t,N} = R\theta_{t,n} =R(\pi/2-\varphi_t)$$

==== Derivation ====
The cosine formula of spherical trigonometry yields for the angle p between the great circles through s that point to the North on one hand and to t on the other hand
$$\cos\theta_{t,N} = \cos\theta_{s,t}\cos\theta_{s,N}+\sin\theta_{s,t}\sin\theta_{s,N}\cos p.$$
$$\sin\varphi_t = \cos\theta_{s,t}\sin\varphi_s +\sin\theta_{s,t}\cos\varphi_s\cos p.$$
The sine formula yields
$$\frac{\sin p}{\sin \theta_{t,N}} = \frac{\sin(\lambda_t-\lambda_s)}{\sin\theta_{s,t}}.$$

Solving this for sin θ_{s,t} and insertion in the previous formula gives an expression for the tangent of the position angle,
$$\sin\varphi_t = \cos\theta_{s,t}\sin\varphi_s +\frac{\sin(\lambda_t-\lambda_s)}{\sin p}\cos\varphi_t\cos\varphi_s\cos p;$$
$$\tan p = \frac{\sin(\lambda_t-\lambda_s)\cos\varphi_t\cos\varphi_s}{\sin\varphi_t-\cos\theta_{s,t}\sin\varphi_s}.$$

==== Further details ====
Because the brief derivation gives an angle between 0 and π which does not reveal the sign (west or east of north ?), a more explicit derivation is desirable which yields separately the sine and the cosine of p such that use of the correct branch of the inverse tangent allows to produce an angle in the full range −π ≤ p ≤ π.

The computation starts from a construction of the great circle between s and t. It lies in the plane that contains the sphere center, s and t and is constructed rotating s by the angle θ_{s,t} around an axis ω. The axis is perpendicular to the plane of the great circle and computed by the normalized vector cross product of the two positions:
$$\mathbf{\omega} = \frac{1}{R^2\sin \theta_{s,t}}\mathbf{s}\times \mathbf{t}
= \frac{1}{\sin \theta_{s,t}}\left(\begin{array}{c}
\cos\varphi_s\sin\lambda_s\sin\varphi_t -\sin\varphi_s\cos\varphi_t\sin\lambda_t
\\
\sin\varphi_s\cos\lambda_t\cos\varphi_t -\cos\varphi_s\sin\varphi_t\cos\lambda_s
\\
\cos\varphi_s\cos\varphi_t\sin(\lambda_t-\lambda_s)
\end{array}\right).$$
A right-handed tilted coordinate system with the center at the center of the sphere is given by the following three axes: the axis s, the axis
$$\mathbf{s}_\perp = \omega \times \frac{1}{R}\mathbf{s} =
\frac{1}{\sin\theta_{s,t}}
\left(\begin{array}{c}
\cos\varphi_t\cos\lambda_t(\sin^2\varphi_s+\cos^2\varphi_s\sin^2\lambda_s)-\cos\lambda_s(\sin\varphi_s\cos\varphi_s\sin\varphi_t+\cos^2\varphi_s\sin\lambda_s\cos\varphi_t\sin\lambda_t)\\
\cos\varphi_t\sin\lambda_t(\sin^2\varphi_s+\cos^2\varphi_s\cos^2\lambda_s)-\sin\lambda_s(\sin\varphi_s\cos\varphi_s\sin\varphi_t+\cos^2\varphi_s\cos\lambda_s\cos\varphi_t\cos\lambda_t)\\
\cos\varphi_s[\cos\varphi_s\sin\varphi_t-\sin\varphi_s\cos\varphi_t\cos(\lambda_t-\lambda_s)]
\end{array}\right)$$
and the axis ω. A position along the great circle is given by the angle θ:
$$\mathbf{s}(\theta) = \cos\theta \mathbf{s}+\sin\theta \mathbf{s}_\perp,\quad 0\le\theta\le 2\pi.$$

The compass direction is given by computing the gradient of the vector with respect to θ at θ = 0.
$$\frac{\partial}{\partial\theta}\mathbf{s}_{\mid \theta=0}=\mathbf{s}_\perp.$$
The angle p is given by splitting this direction along two orthogonal directions in the plane tangential to the sphere at the point s. The two directions are given by the partial derivatives of s with respect to φ and with respect to λ, normalized to unit length:
$$\mathbf{u}_N = \left(
\begin{array}{c}
-\sin\varphi_s\cos\lambda_s\\
-\sin\varphi_s\sin\lambda_s\\
\cos\varphi_s
\end{array}\right);$$
$$\mathbf{u}_E = \left(\begin{array}{c}
-\sin\lambda_s\\
\cos\lambda_s\\
0
\end{array}
\right);$$
$$\mathbf{u}_N\cdot \mathbf{s} = \mathbf{u}_E\cdot \mathbf{u}_N =0$$
u_{N} points north and u_{E} points east at the position s. The position angle p projects s_{⊥} into these two directions,
$$\mathbf{s}_\perp = \cos p \,\mathbf{u}_N+\sin p\, \mathbf{u}_E,$$
where the positive sign means the positive position angles are defined to be north over east. The values of the cosine and sine of p are computed by multiplying this equation on both sides with the two unit vectors,
$$\cos p = \mathbf{s}_\perp \cdot \mathbf{u}_N
=\frac{1}{\sin\theta_{s,t}}[\cos\varphi_s\sin\varphi_t - \sin\varphi_s\cos\varphi_t\cos(\lambda_t-\lambda_s)];$$
$$\sin p = \mathbf{s}_\perp \cdot \mathbf{u}_E
=\frac{1}{\sin\theta_{s,t}}[\cos\varphi_t\sin(\lambda_t-\lambda_s)].$$

Instead of inserting the convoluted expression of s_{⊥}, the evaluation may employ that the triple product is invariant under a circular shift of the three arguments:
$$\cos p = (\mathbf{\omega}\times \frac{1}{R}\mathbf{s})\cdot \mathbf{u}_N
= \omega\cdot(\frac{1}{R}\mathbf{s}\times \mathbf{u}_N).$$

If atan2 is used to compute the value, one can reduce both expressions by division through cos φ_{t} and multiplication by sin θ_{s,t}, because these values are always positive and that operation does not change signs; then effectively
$$\tan p = \frac{\sin p}{\cos p}=\frac{\sin(\lambda_t-\lambda_s)}{\cos\varphi_s\tan\varphi_t -\sin\varphi_s\cos(\lambda_t-\lambda_s)}.$$

== Finding way-points ==
To find the way-points, that is the positions of selected points on the great circle between P_{1} and P_{2}, we first extrapolate the great circle back to its node A, the point at which the great circle crosses the equator in the northward direction: let the longitude of this point be λ_{0} — see Fig 1. The azimuth at this point, α_{0}, is given by
$$\tan\alpha_0 = \frac
{\sin\alpha_1 \cos\phi_1}{\sqrt{\cos^2\alpha_1 + \sin^2\alpha_1\sin^2\phi_1}}.$$
(Note: A simpler formula is $$\sin\alpha_0 = \sin\alpha_1 \cos\phi_1;$$ however, this is less accurate α_{0} ≈ ±1/2π.) Let the angular distances along the great circle from A to P_{1} and P_{2} be σ_{01} and σ_{02} respectively. Then using Napier's rules we have
$$\tan\sigma_{01} = \frac{\tan\phi_1}{\cos\alpha_1}
\qquad$$
(If φ_{1} = 0 and α_{1} = 1/2π, use σ_{01} = 0).

This gives σ_{01}, whence σ_{02} = σ_{01} + σ_{12}.

The longitude at the node is found from
$$\begin{align}
\tan\lambda_{01} &= \frac{\sin\alpha_0\sin\sigma_{01}}{\cos\sigma_{01}},\\
\lambda_0 &= \lambda_1 - \lambda_{01}.
\end{align}$$

Figure 2. The great circle path between a node (an equator crossing) and an arbitrary point (φ, λ).

Finally, calculate the position and azimuth at an arbitrary point, P (see Fig. 2), by the spherical version of the direct geodesic problem. (Note: The direct geodesic problem, finding the position of P_{2} given P_{1}, α_{1}, and s_{12}, can also be solved by formulas for solving a spherical triangle, as follows, $$\begin{align} \sigma_{12} &= s_{12}/R,\\ \sin\phi_2 &= \sin\phi_1\cos\sigma_{12} + \cos\phi_1\sin\sigma_{12}\cos\alpha_1,\quad\text{or}\\ \tan\phi_2 &= \frac{\sin\phi_1\cos\sigma_{12} + \cos\phi_1\sin\sigma_{12}\cos\alpha_1} {\sqrt{ (\cos\phi_1\cos\sigma_{12} - \sin\phi_1\sin\sigma_{12}\cos\alpha_1)^2 + (\sin\sigma_{12}\sin\alpha_1)^2 }},\\ \tan\lambda_{12} &= \frac{\sin\sigma_{12}\sin\alpha_1} {\cos\phi_1\cos\sigma_{12} - \sin\phi_1\sin\sigma_{12}\cos\alpha_1},\\ \lambda_2 &= \lambda_1 + \lambda_{12},\\ \tan\alpha_2 &= \frac{\sin\alpha_1} {\cos\sigma_{12}\cos\alpha_1 - \tan\phi_1\sin\sigma_{12}}. \end{align}$$ The solution for way-points given in the main text is more general than this solution in that it allows way-points at specified longitudes to be found. In addition, the solution for σ (i.e., the position of the node) is needed when finding geodesics on an ellipsoid by means of the auxiliary sphere.) Napier's rules give
$${\color{white}.\,\qquad)}\tan\phi = \frac
{\cos\alpha_0\sin\sigma}{\sqrt{\cos^2\sigma + \sin^2\alpha_0\sin^2\sigma}},$$
(Note: A simpler formula is $$\sin\phi = \cos\alpha_0\sin\sigma;$$ however, this is less accurate when φ ≈ ±1/2π)
$$\begin{align}
\tan(\lambda - \lambda_0) &= \frac
{\sin\alpha_0\sin\sigma}{\cos\sigma},\\
\tan\alpha &= \frac
{\tan\alpha_0}{\cos\sigma}.
\end{align}$$
The atan2 function should be used to determine σ_{01}, λ, and α. For example, to find the midpoint of the path, substitute σ = 1/2(σ_{01} + σ_{02}); alternatively to find the point a distance d from the starting point, take σ = σ_{01} + d/R. Likewise, the vertex, the point on the great circle with greatest latitude, is found by substituting σ = 1/2π. It may be convenient to parameterize the route in terms of the longitude using
$$\tan\phi = \cot\alpha_0\sin(\lambda-\lambda_0).$$
(Note: The following is used: $\cos\sigma = \cos\phi \cos(\lambda-\lambda_0)$) Latitudes at regular intervals of longitude can be found and the resulting positions transferred to the Mercator chart allowing the great circle to be approximated by a series of rhumb lines. The path determined in this way gives the great ellipse joining the end points, provided the coordinates $(\phi,\lambda)$ are interpreted as geographic coordinates on the ellipsoid.

These formulas apply to a spherical model of the Earth. They are also used in solving for the great circle on the auxiliary sphere which is a device for finding the shortest path, or geodesic, on an ellipsoid of revolution; see the article on geodesics on an ellipsoid.

== Example ==
Compute the great circle route from Valparaíso, φ_{1} = −33°, λ_{1} = −71.6°, to Shanghai, φ_{2} = 31.4°, λ_{2} = 121.8°.

The formulas for course and distance give λ_{12} = −166.6°, (Note: λ_{12} is reduced to the range [−180°, 180°] by adding or subtracting 360° as necessary) α_{1} = −94.41°, α_{2} = −78.42°, and σ_{12} = 168.56°. Taking the earth radius to be R = 6371 km, the distance is s_{12} = 18743 km.

To compute points along the route, first find α_{0} = −56.74°, σ_{01} = −96.76°, σ_{02} = 71.8°, λ_{01} = 98.07°, and λ_{0} = −169.67°. Then to compute the midpoint of the route (for example), take σ = 1/2(σ_{01} + σ_{02}) = −12.48°, and solve for φ = −6.81°, λ = −159.18°, and α = −57.36°.

If the geodesic is computed accurately on the WGS84 ellipsoid, the results are α_{1} = −94.82°, α_{2} = −78.29°, and s_{12} = 18752 km. The midpoint of the geodesic is φ = −7.07°, λ = −159.31°, α = −57.45°.

== Gnomonic chart ==
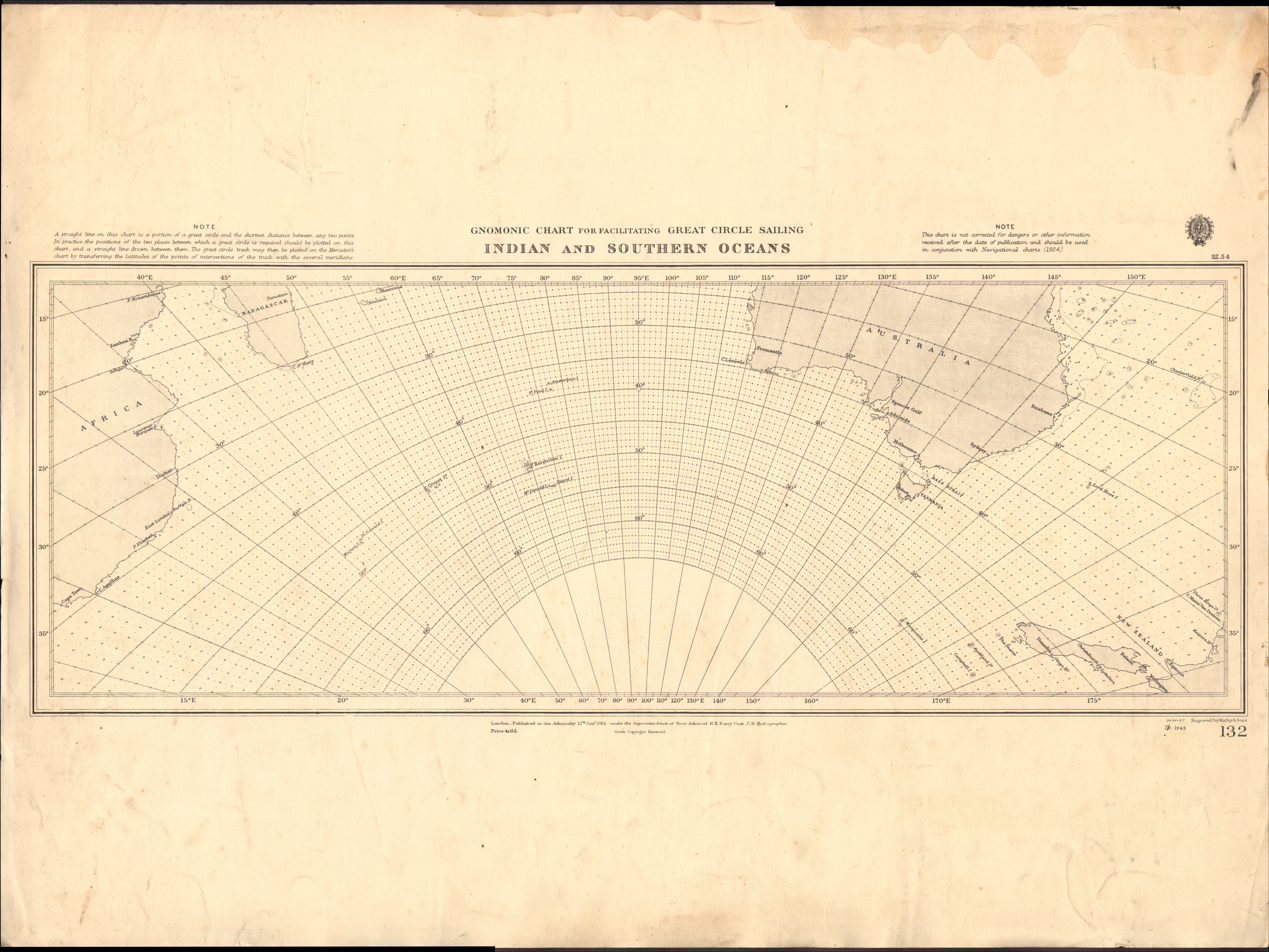
Admiralty Gnomonic Chart of the Indian and Southern Oceans, for use in plotting great circle tracks

A straight line drawn on a gnomonic chart is a portion of a great circle. When this is transferred to a Mercator chart, it becomes a curve. The positions are transferred at a convenient interval of longitude and this track is plotted on the Mercator chart for navigation.

== See also ==
- Compass rose
- Great circle
- Great-circle distance
- Great ellipse
- Geodesics on an ellipsoid
- Geographical distance
- Isoazimuthal
- Loxodromic navigation
- Map
  - Portolan map
- Marine sandglass
- Rhumb line
- Spherical trigonometry
- Windrose network
