= Seiffert's spiral =

Seiffert's spherical spiral is a curve on a sphere made by moving on the sphere with constant speed and angular velocity with respect to a fixed diameter. If the selected diameter is the line from the north pole to the south pole, then the requirement of constant angular velocity means that the longitude of the moving point changes at a constant rate. The cylindrical coordinates of the varying point on this curve are given by the Jacobian elliptic functions.

== Formulation ==
=== Symbols ===
| $r$ | cylindrical radius |
| $\theta$ | angle of curve from beginning of spiral to a particular point on the spiral |
| $\operatorname{sn}(s, k)$ $\operatorname{cn}(s, k)$ | basic Jacobi Elliptic Function |
| $\vartheta_{i}(s)$ | Jacobi Theta Functions (where $i$ the kind of Theta Functions show) |
| $k$ | elliptic modulus (any positive real constant) |

=== Representation via equations ===
The Seiffert's spherical spiral can be expressed in cylindrical coordinates as

$r = \operatorname{sn}(s, k),\, \theta = k \cdot s \text{ and } z = \operatorname{cn}(s, k)$

or expressed as Jacobi theta functions

$r = \frac{\vartheta_{3}(0) \cdot \vartheta_{1}(s \cdot \vartheta_{3}^{-2}(0))}{\vartheta_{2}(0) \cdot \vartheta_{4}(s \cdot \vartheta_{3}^{-2}(0))},\, \theta = \frac{\vartheta_{2}^{2}(q)}{\vartheta_{3}^{2}(q)} \cdot s \text{ and } z = \frac{\vartheta_{4}(0) \cdot \vartheta_{3}(s \cdot \vartheta_{3}^{-2}(0))}{\vartheta_{3}(0) \cdot \vartheta_{4}(s \cdot \vartheta_{3}^{-2}(0))}$.

== See also ==
- Rhumb line
