= Navigational algorithms =

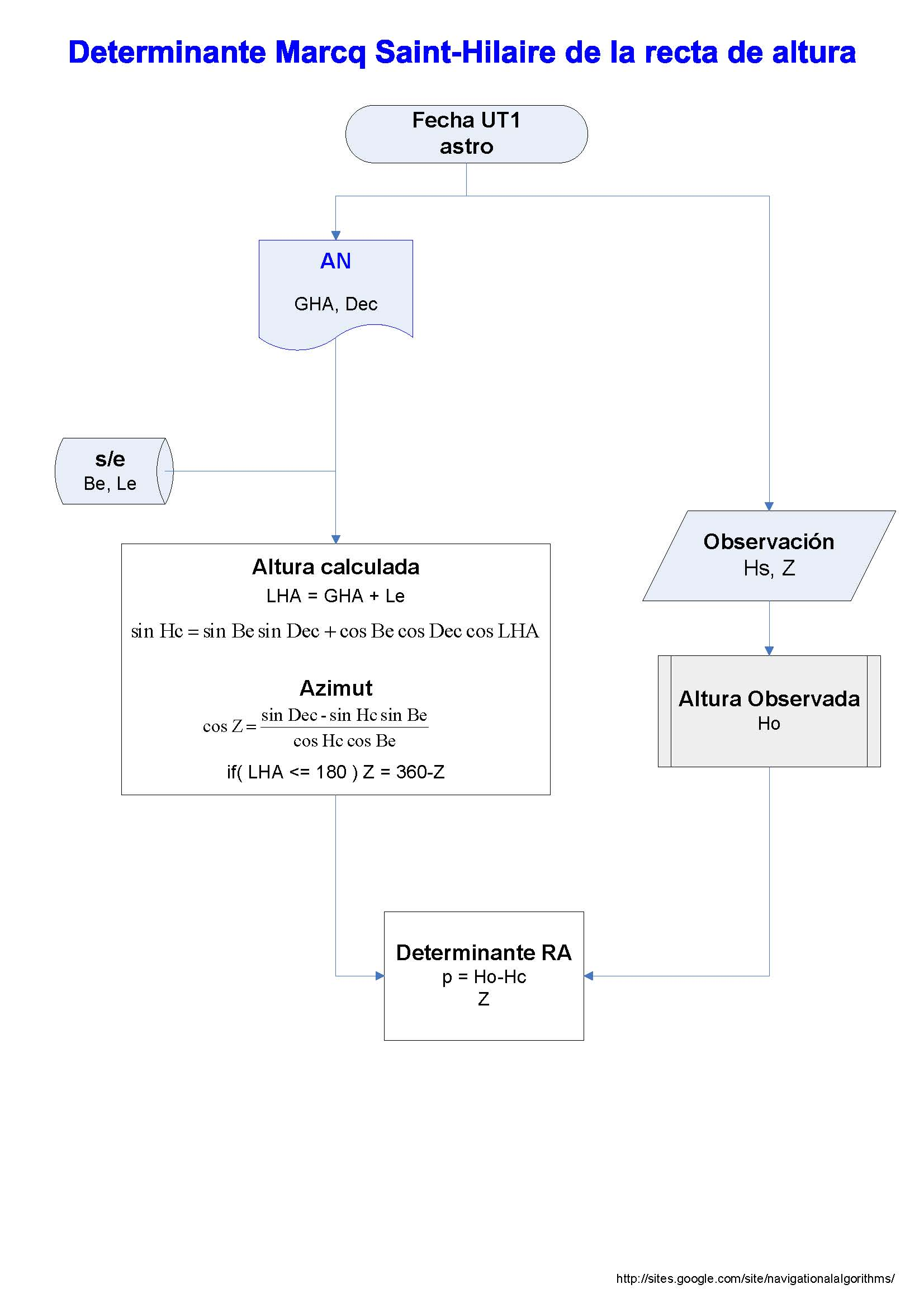
Obtaining the height line Marcq St. Hilaire

The navigational algorithms are the quintessence of the executable software on portable calculators or smartphones as an aid to the art of navigation, this attempt article describe both algorithms and software for smartphones implementing different calculation procedures for navigation. The calculation power obtained by the languages—Basic, C, Java, etc.—from portable calculators or smartphones, has made it possible to develop programs that allow calculating the position without the need for tables, in fact they have some basic tables with the correction factors for each year and calculate the values "on the fly" at runtime.

== Comparison between manual calculation methods and the use of calculators ==
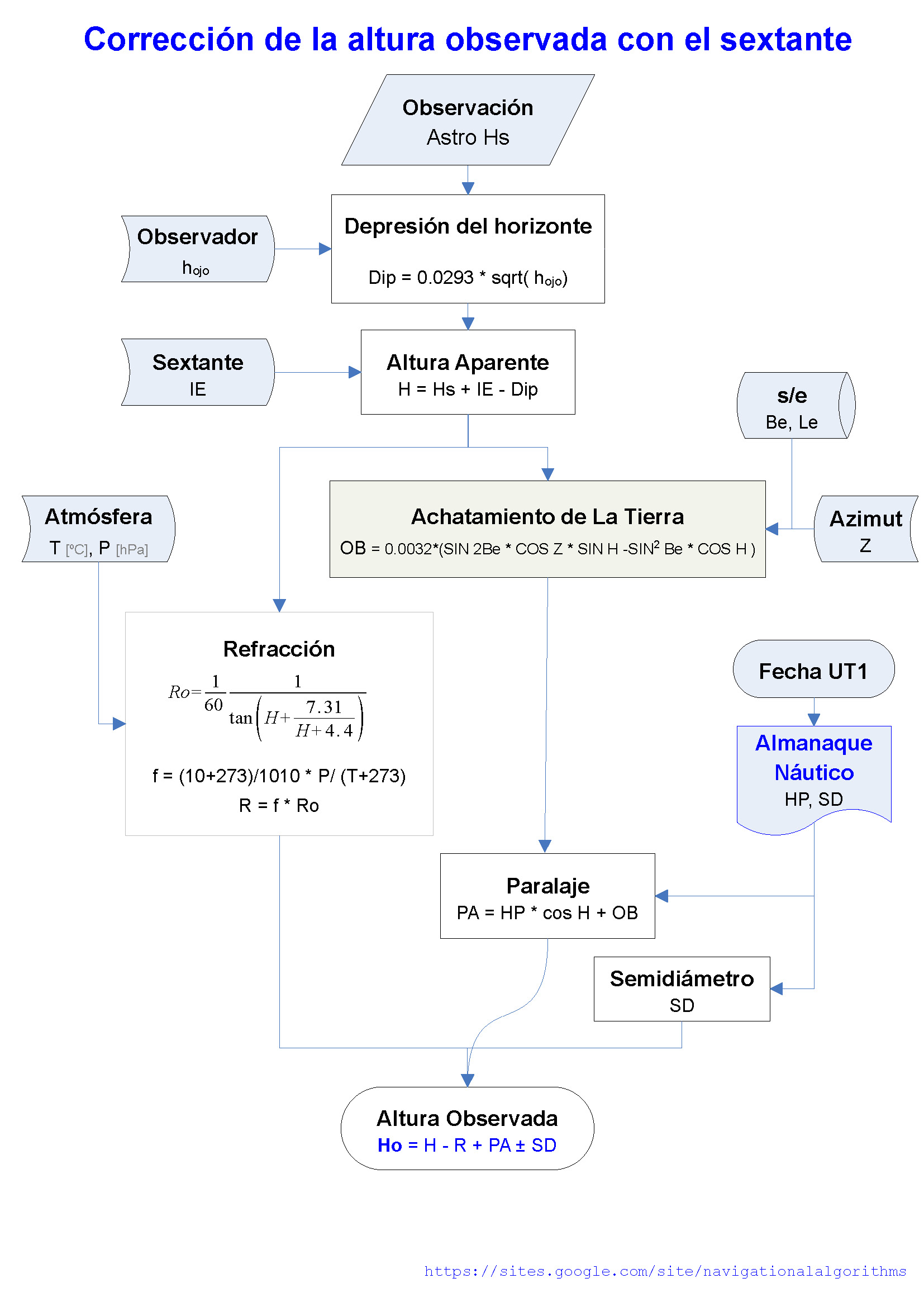
Hs..Corrections ..

- The traditional methods require bulky and expensive nautical tables (which must be uSmartphoneted), pencil and paper, and calculation time, following the working algorithms.
- Calculators (and the like) do not need books (they have tables and ephemeris integrated) and, with their own algorithms, allow quick and error-free calculation of navigation problems.

== Types of algorithms ==
- Celestial navigation: Sight reduction, circle of equal altitude, Line Of Position, Fix...
- Positional astronomy: RA, GHA, Dec
- Coastal navigation: Range, Bearing, Horizontal angles, IALA...
- Sailings: Rhumbs, Loxodromic, Orthodromic, Meridional parts...
- Weather, tides
- Software PC- Smartphone: Nautical Almanac, Sailings, Variation, Sextant corrections

== Programs for general navigation ==
Programs on the nautical chart, directions, coastal navigation and beacons, nautical publications. The astronomical navigation section includes the resolution of the position triangle, the usefulness of a height line, the recognition of stars and the determinant of the height line, in addition to other topics of interest in nautical: tides, naval kinematics, meteorology and hurricanes, and oceanography. All heading measurements made with a magnetic compass or compass must be corrected for magnetic declination or local variation.

=== Coordinate conversion subroutine ===
sub Rectang2Polar (a () as double, b () as double) static
 '----- Subprograma para convertir un vector de estado coord.cartesianas
 '----- En vector de estado en coord.polars.
 '----- De entrada: vector de estado en coord.cartesianes
 '----- De salida: vector de estado en coord.polars.
 '----- NOTA: El vector de velocidad polar es el de la velocidad total,
 '----- Corregido por el efecto de la latitud.
 '------------------------------------------------- ------------------------
 mar x as double
 mar y as double
 mar z as double
 mar x_dot as double
 mar y_dot as double
 mar z_dot as double
 mar rho as double
 mar r as double
 mar lambda as double
 mar beta as double
 mar lambda_dot as double
 mar beta_dot as double
 mar r_dot as double
 x = a (1)
 y = a (2)
 z = a (3)
 x_dot = a (4)
 y_dot = a (5)
 z_dot = a (6)
 rho = sqr (x * x+y * y)
 r = sqr (rho * rho+z * z)
 lambda = atan2 (y, x)
 beta = atan2 (z, rho)
 if (z <0 #) then beta = beta - TWOPI
 yf rho = 0 # then
   lambda_dot = 0 #
     beta_dot = 0 #
 else
   lambda_dot = (x * y_dot - y * x_dot)/(rho * rho)
     beta_dot = (z_dot * rho * rho - z * (x * x_dot+_
                  y * y_dot))/(r * r * rho)
 end if
 r_dot = (x * x_dot+y * y_dot+z * z_dot)/r
 '----- Componentes del vector de posición
 b (1) = lambda
 if b (1)> = TWOPI then b (1) = b (1) - TWOPI
 b (2) = beta
 b (3) = r
 '----- Componentes del vector velocidad total
 b (4) = r * lambda_dot * cuerpo (beta)
 b (5) = r * beta_dot
 b (6) = r_dot
end sub

== Programs for astronomical navigation ==
Advanced navigation algorithms include piloting and astronomical navigation: loxodromia and orthodromia. Height correction of the sextant . Astronomical position with calculator, template and blank mercantile chart. Position by 2 Lines of Height. Position from n Height Lines. Vector equation of the Height Circle. Position for vector solution from two observations. Position by Height Circles: matrix solution. And articles related to ancient procedures such as obtaining latitude by the pole star, the meridian, the method of lunar distances, etc.

=== Programs for the "Nautical Almanac" ===
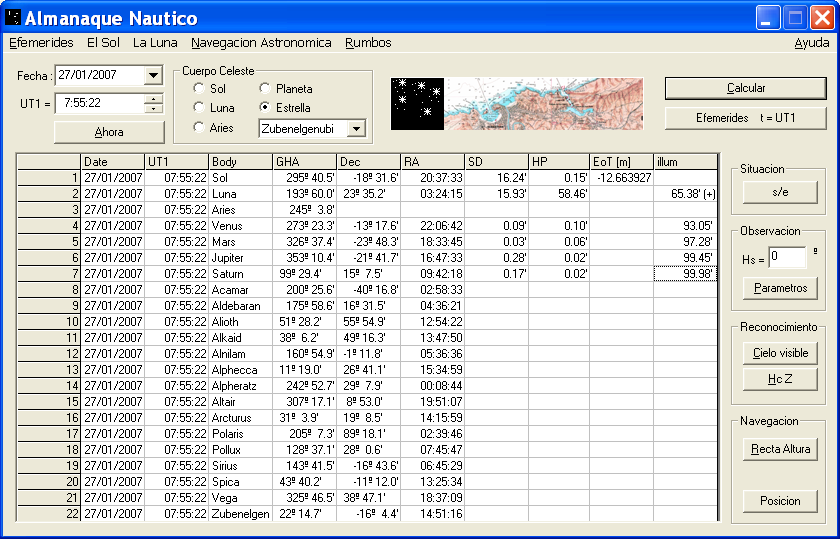
Example Nautical Almanac Program

Ephemerides of the celestial bodies used in navigation.

- GHA - Greenwich Hour Angle
- Dec - Declination
- SD - Semidiameter
- HP - Horizontal Parallax
- s the solution for course and SOG.

=== CelestialFix ===
They solve the problem of calculating the position from observations of the stars made with the sextant in Astronomical Navigation.

Algorithm implementation:

For n = 2 observations

- An analytical solution of the two star sight problem of celestial navigation, James A. Van Allen.
  - Vector Solution for the Intersection of two Circles of Equal Altitude. Andrés Ruiz.

For n ≥ 2 observations

- DeWit/USNO Nautical Almanac/Compac Data, Least squares algorithm for n LOPs
- Kaplan algorithm, USNO. For n ≥ 8 observations, gives the solution for course and SOG.

=== Magnetic declination ===
Any measure of course made with a magnetic compass must be corrected because of the magnetic declination or local variation.

== See also ==
- American Practical Navigator
- Celestial navigation
- Institute of Navigation (NAVIGATION journal)
- Lunar distance (navigation)
- Nautical almanac
- Navigation
- Rhumbline network
- Royal Institute of Navigation (Journal of Navigation)
- Sextant
- Shortest path problem and automotive navigation, for navigational algorithms in other domains
