= Teixeira planisphere =

1573 world map by Domingos Teixeira

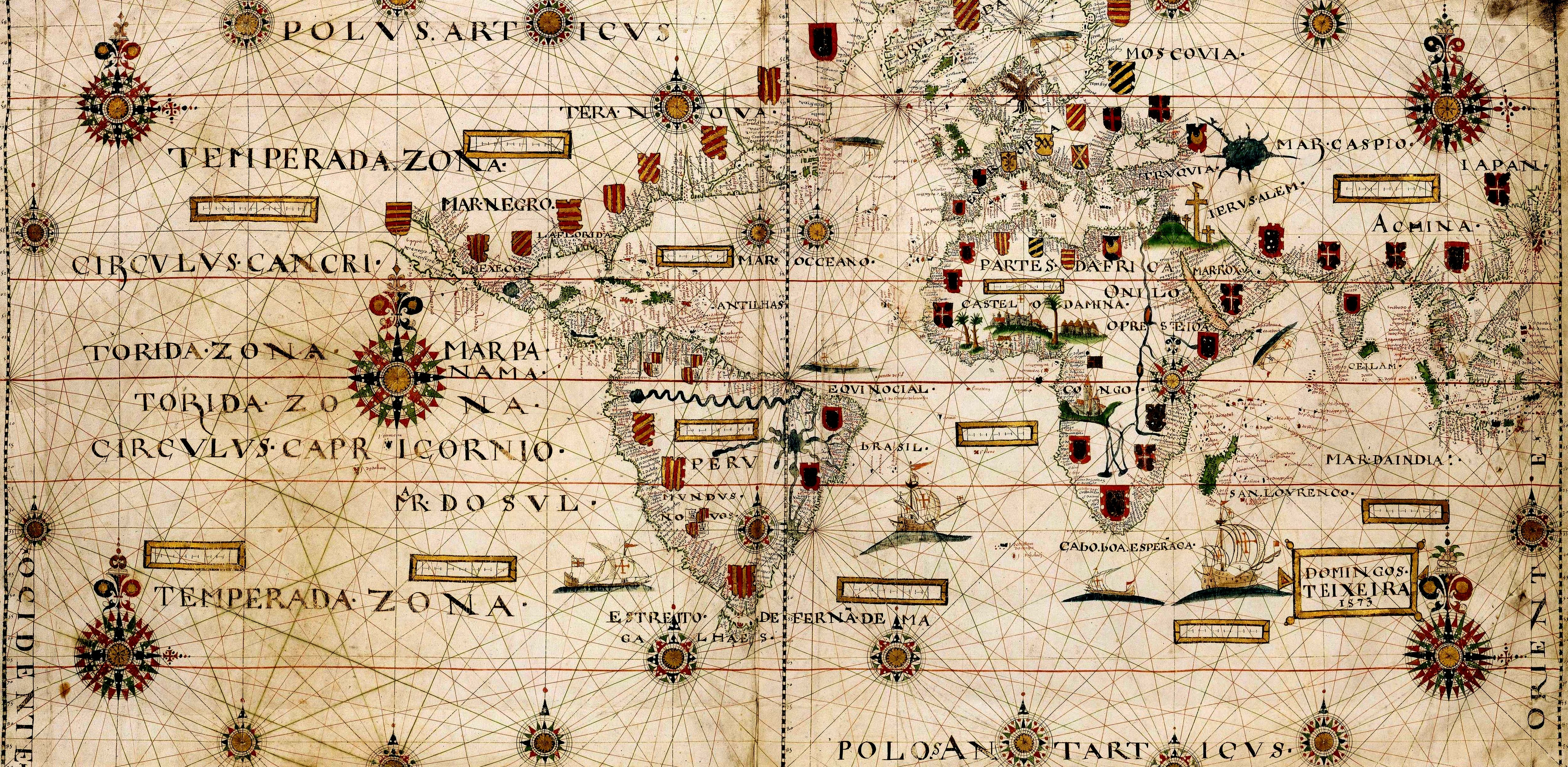
Planisphere of Domingos Teixeira (1573)

The Planisphere of Domingos Teixeira is a hand-painted parchment map of the world made by a Portuguese cartographer in 1573, during the reign of Sebastian of Portugal. It is conserved in the Bibliothèque nationale de France.

== Datasheet ==
- Date: 1573
- Author: Domingos Teixeira (Portugal).
- Cartographic School: Portuguese.
- Brief description: World Map.
- Physical Location: Bibliothèque nationale de France

== Description ==
It is one of the first full world maps showing the spice routes, both the Portuguese route of Vasco da Gama, following the east route and the Spanish route towards the west, discovered by Ferdinand Magellan (shows the Terra Magellanica not yet circumnavigated by Diego Ramirez de Arellano that christened it Isla de Xativa.

You can see the scope of the Tordesillas Meridian, both on the side of America (Brazil) and at the opposite side of the world at the Philippines, that according to the treaty of Zaragoza should belong to Portugal, as they are in the "Portuguese" hemisphere.

== See also ==
- Ancient world maps
- Portuguese discoveries
- World map
- Windrose network
- La Cartografía Mallorquina
