= Isoazimuth =

The isoazimuth is the locus of the points on the Earth's surface whose initial orthodromic course with respect to a fixed point is constant.

That is, if the initial orthodromic course Z from the starting point S to the fixed point X is 80 degrees, the associated isoazimuth is formed by all points whose initial orthodromic course with respect to point X is 80° (with respect to true north). The isoazimuth is written using the notation isoz(X, Z) .

The isoazimuth is of use when navigating with respect to an object of known location, such as a radio beacon. A straight line called the azimuth line of position is drawn on a map, and on most common map projections this is a close enough approximation to the isoazimuth. On the Littrow projection, the correspondence is exact. This line is then crossed with an astronomical observation called Sumner line, and the result gives an estimate of the navigator's position.

== Isoazimutal on the spherical Earth ==
Let X be a fixed point on the Earth of coordinates latitude: $B_2$, and longitude: $L_2$. In a terrestrial spherical model, the equation of isoazimuth curve with initial course C passing through point S(B, L) is:
$$\tan(B_2)\cos(B) = \sin(B) \cos(L_2-L)+\sin(L_2-L)/\tan(C)\;$$

== Isoazimutal of a star ==
In this case the X point is the illuminating pole of the observed star, and the angle Z is its azimuth. The equation of the isoazimuthal curve for a star with coordinates (Dec, GHA), - Declination and Greenwich hour angle -, observed under an azimuth Z is given by:
$$\cot(Z)/\cos(B) = \tan(Dec)/\sin(LHA)-\tan(B)/\tan(LHA)\;$$
where LHA is the local hour angle, and all points with latitude B and longitude L, they define the curve.

== See also ==
- Great circle
- Rhumb line
- Cartography
- Navigational algorithms
