= Great circle =

Spherical geometry analog of a straight line

The great circle g (green) lies in a plane through the sphere's center O (black). The perpendicular line a (purple) through the center is called the axis of g, and its two intersections with the sphere, P and P' (red), are the poles of g. Any great circle s (blue) through the poles is secondary to g.

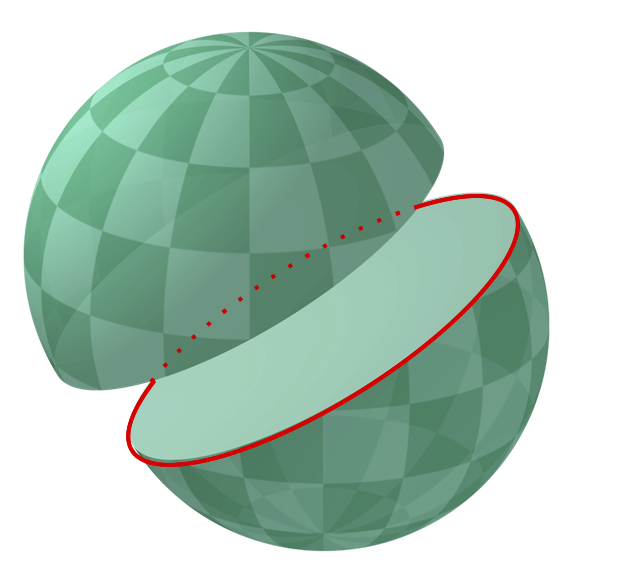
A great circle divides the sphere in two equal hemispheres.

In mathematics, a great circle or orthodrome is the circular intersection of a sphere and a diametral plane, which is a plane passing through the sphere's center point.

== Discussion ==
Any arc of a great circle is a geodesic of the sphere, so that great circles in spherical geometry are the natural analog of straight lines in Euclidean space. For any pair of distinct non-antipodal points on the sphere, there is a unique great circle passing through both. (Every great circle through any point also passes through its antipodal point, so there are infinitely many great circles through two antipodal points.) The shorter of the two great-circle arcs between two distinct points on the sphere is called the minor arc, and is the shortest surface-path between them. Its arc length is the great-circle distance between the points (the intrinsic distance on a sphere), and is proportional to the measure of the central angle formed by the two points and the center of the sphere.

A great circle is the largest circle that can be drawn on any given sphere. Any diameter of any great circle coincides with a diameter of the sphere, and therefore every great circle is concentric with the sphere and shares the same radius. Any other circle of the sphere is called a small circle, and is the intersection of the sphere with a plane not passing through its center. Small circles are the spherical-geometry analog of circles in Euclidean space.

Every circle in Euclidean 3-space is a great circle of exactly one sphere.

The disk bounded by a great circle is called a great disk: it is the intersection of a ball and a plane passing through its center. In higher dimensions, the great circles on the n-sphere are the intersection of the n-sphere with 2-planes that pass through the origin in the Euclidean space R^{n + 1}.

Half of a great circle may be called a great semicircle (e.g., as in parts of a meridian in astronomy).

== Derivation of shortest paths ==
To prove that the minor arc of a great circle is the shortest path connecting two points on the surface of a sphere, one can apply calculus of variations to it.

Consider the class of all regular paths from a point $p$ to another point $q$. Introduce spherical coordinates so that $p$ coincides with the north pole. Any curve on the sphere that does not intersect either pole, except possibly at the endpoints, can be parametrized by
$$\theta = \theta(t),\quad \phi = \phi(t),\quad a\le t\le b$$
provided $\phi$ is allowed to take on arbitrary real values. The infinitesimal arc length in these coordinates is
$$ds=r\sqrt{\theta'^2+\phi'^{2}\sin^{2}\theta}\, dt.$$

So the length of a curve $\gamma$ from $p$ to $q$ is a functional of the curve given by
$$S[\gamma]=r\int_a^b\sqrt{\theta'^2+\phi'^{2}\sin^{2}\theta}\, dt.$$

According to the Euler–Lagrange equation, $S[\gamma]$ is minimized if and only if
$$\frac{\sin^2\theta\phi'}{\sqrt{\theta'^2+\phi'^2\sin^2\theta}}=C,$$
where $C$ is a $t$-independent constant, and
$$\frac{\sin\theta\cos\theta\phi'^2}{\sqrt{\theta'^2+\phi'^2\sin^2\theta}}=\frac{d}{dt}\frac{\theta'}{\sqrt{\theta'^2+\phi'^2\sin^2\theta}}.$$
From the first equation of these two, it can be obtained that
$$\phi'=\frac{C\theta'}{\sin\theta\sqrt{\sin^2\theta-C^2}}.$$
Integrating both sides and considering the boundary condition, the real solution of $C$ is zero. Thus, $\phi'=0$ and $\theta$ can be any value between 0 and $\theta_0$, indicating that the curve must lie on a meridian of the sphere. In a Cartesian coordinate system, this is
$$x\sin\phi_0 - y\cos\phi_0 = 0$$
which is a plane through the origin, i.e., the center of the sphere.

== Applications ==
Some examples of great circles on the celestial sphere include the celestial horizon, the celestial equator, and the ecliptic. Great circles are also used as rather accurate approximations of geodesics on the Earth's surface for air or sea navigation (although it is not a perfect sphere), as well as on spheroidal celestial bodies.

The equator of the idealized earth is a great circle and any meridian and its opposite meridian form a great circle. Another great circle is the one that divides the land and water hemispheres. A great circle divides the earth into two hemispheres and if a great circle passes through a point it must pass through its antipodal point.

The Funk transform integrates a function along all great circles of the sphere.

== See also ==
- Great ellipse
- Rhumb line
