= Great ellipse =

Ellipse on a spheroid centered on its origin

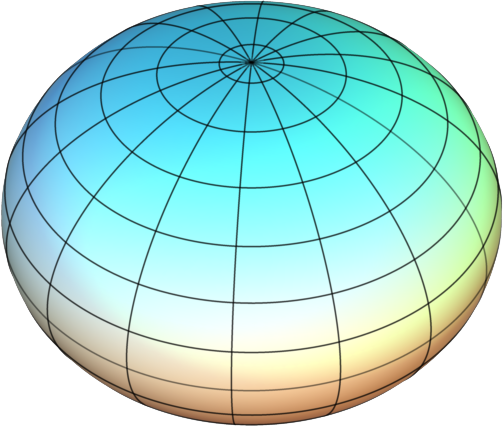
A spheroid

A great ellipse is an ellipse passing through two points on a spheroid and having the same center as that of the spheroid. Equivalently, it is an ellipse on the surface of a spheroid and centered on the origin, or the curve formed by intersecting the spheroid by a plane through its center. For points that are separated by less than about a quarter of the circumference of the earth, about $10\,000\,\mathrm{km}$, the length of the great ellipse connecting the points is close (within one part in 500,000) to the geodesic distance. The great ellipse therefore is sometimes proposed as a suitable route for marine navigation. The great ellipse is special case of an earth section path.

== Introduction ==
Assume that the spheroid, an ellipsoid of revolution, has an equatorial radius $a$ and polar semi-axis $b$. Define the flattening $f=(a-b)/a$, the eccentricity $e=\sqrt{f(2-f)}$, and the second eccentricity $e'=e/(1-f)$. Consider two points: $A$ at (geographic) latitude $\phi_1$ and longitude $\lambda_1$ and $B$ at latitude $\phi_2$ and longitude $\lambda_2$. The connecting great ellipse (from $A$ to $B$) has length $s_{12}$ and has azimuths $\alpha_1$ and $\alpha_2$ at the two endpoints.

There are various ways to map an ellipsoid into a sphere of radius $a$ in such a way as to map the great ellipse into a great circle, allowing the methods of great-circle navigation to be used:

- The ellipsoid can be stretched in a direction parallel to the axis of rotation; this maps a point of latitude $\phi$ on the ellipsoid to a point on the sphere with latitude $\beta$, the parametric latitude.
- A point on the ellipsoid can mapped radially onto the sphere along the line connecting it with the center of the ellipsoid; this maps a point of latitude $\phi$ on the ellipsoid to a point on the sphere with latitude $\theta$, the geocentric latitude.
- The ellipsoid can be stretched into a prolate ellipsoid with polar semi-axis $a^2/b$ and then mapped radially onto the sphere; this preserves the latitude—the latitude on the sphere is $\phi$, the geographic latitude.

The last method gives an easy way to generate a succession of way-points on the great ellipse connecting two known points $A$ and $B$. Solve for the great circle between $(\phi_1,\lambda_1)$ and $(\phi_2,\lambda_2)$ and find the way-points on the great circle. These map into way-points on the corresponding great ellipse.

== Mapping the great ellipse to a great circle ==
If distances and headings are needed, it is simplest to use the first of the mappings. In detail, the mapping is as follows (this description is taken from):

- The geographic latitude $\phi$ on the ellipsoid maps to the parametric latitude $\beta$ on the sphere, where
  $a\tan\beta = b\tan\phi.$
- The longitude $\lambda$ is unchanged.
- The azimuth $\alpha$ on the ellipsoid maps to an azimuth $\gamma$ on the sphere where
  $$\begin{align}
\tan\alpha &= \frac{\tan\gamma}{\sqrt{1-e^2\cos^2\beta}}, \\
\tan\gamma &= \frac{\tan\alpha}{\sqrt{1+e'^2\cos^2\phi}},
\end{align}$$
  and the quadrants of $\alpha$ and $\gamma$ are the same.
- Positions on the great circle of radius $a$ are parametrized by arc length $\sigma$ measured from the northward crossing of the equator. The great ellipse has a semi-axes $a$ and $a \sqrt{1 - e^2\cos^2\gamma_0}$, where $\gamma_0$ is the great-circle azimuth at the northward equator crossing, and $\sigma$ is the parametric angle on the ellipse.

(A similar mapping to an auxiliary sphere is carried out in the solution of geodesics on an ellipsoid. The differences are that the azimuth $\alpha$ is conserved in the mapping, while the longitude $\lambda$ maps to a "spherical" longitude $\omega$. The equivalent ellipse used for distance calculations has semi-axes $b \sqrt{1 + e'^2\cos^2\alpha_0}$ and $b$.)

== Solving the inverse problem ==
The "inverse problem" is the determination of $s_{12}$, $\alpha_1$, and $\alpha_2$, given the positions of $A$ and $B$. This is solved by computing $\beta_1$ and $\beta_2$ and solving for the great-circle between $(\beta_1,\lambda_1)$ and $(\beta_2,\lambda_2)$.

The spherical azimuths are relabeled as $\gamma$ (from $\alpha$). Thus $\gamma_0$, $\gamma_1$, and $\gamma_2$ and the spherical azimuths at the equator and at $A$ and $B$. The azimuths of the endpoints of great ellipse, $\alpha_1$ and $\alpha_2$, are computed from $\gamma_1$ and $\gamma_2$.

The semi-axes of the great ellipse can be found using the value of $\gamma_0$.

Also determined as part of the solution of the great circle problem are the arc lengths, $\sigma_{01}$ and $\sigma_{02}$, measured from the equator crossing to $A$ and $B$. The distance $s_{12}$ is found by computing the length of a portion of perimeter of the ellipse using the formula giving the meridian arc in terms the parametric latitude. In applying this formula, use the semi-axes for the great ellipse (instead of for the meridian) and substitute $\sigma_{01}$ and $\sigma_{02}$ for $\beta$.

The solution of the "direct problem", determining the position of $B$ given $A$, $\alpha_1$, and $s_{12}$, can be similarly be found (this requires, in addition, the inverse meridian distance formula). This also enables way-points (e.g., a series of equally spaced intermediate points) to be found in the solution of the inverse problem.

== See also ==
- Earth section paths
- Great-circle navigation
- Geodesics on an ellipsoid
- Meridian arc
- Rhumb line
