= Real-time geotagging =

Geotagging for immediate publication

Real-time geotagging refers to the automatic technique of acquiring media (such as photos, audio or video), associating a specific location with the media, transferring the media to an online map and publishing the media in real time. It is thus an extension of an automatic geotagging process, requiring an in-built or attached location acquisition device (such as GPS or Wi-Fi positioning system), but also requires communication with a wireless data transfer device (such as mobile phone networks or Wi-Fi networks). Most modern smartphones and several digital cameras already integrate camera, aGPS, and wireless data transfer into one device, thus directly producing a geotagged photograph. Real-time geotagging is sometimes referred to as "mobile geotagging" or "autogeotagging", but this does not imply the real-time publishing step.

== Location Acquisition ==
Geotagging is gaining popularity with photographers to produce geotagged photographs. A few cameras have built-in geolocation capability. Most, apart from smartphones, do not, so many photographers rely on external GPS receivers to determine location. Location may be inserted immediately into the picture file by tethering with Bluetooth or suitable wired connection, which are about as rare in cameras as the built-in autogeotagging feature.

GPS units, internal or external, require a lock from at least three satellites (for position), which usually requires up to 60 seconds. However, acquisition time is decreasing rapidly with hardware improvements. Some 21st-century GPS receivers use cell tower location and one global positioning satellite to obtain a faster lock on location. This assisted GPS (aGPS) technology is usual in cellular phones.

One alternative to GPS is WiFi triangulation which uses the MAC addresses of nearby wireless access points to determine position. Automatic geotagging relies on media acquisition devices that contain GPS, aGPS, or WiFi or other local positioning systems. Many camera phones use all these methods: GPS, aGPS, cell tower signals, and WiFi triangulation.

Locations may be added later using a user's computer or a photo sharing web site such as Wikimedia Commons. It has even been proposed that in future, it may be possible to deduce the locations of photos purely by comparison with large numbers of geotagged photos. These geotagging techniques rely on post-processing of media, recorded tracks and/or MAC addresses, and cannot be used for real-time geotagging.

With the rapid rise of mobile smartphones which integrate GPS receivers and cameras, and relative market stagnation of separate devices, these phones are the most numerous instruments for autogeotagging. Those that don't include this ability in their stock software may acquire it by installing appropriate mobile apps.

== Applications ==
Wireless data transfer allows real-time mapping of media. Transferring images from cell phones to social networking sites is gaining popularity. Applications for real-time mapping include travel, real estate, geosocial networking, people tracking, security, and geofencing.

Geotagging allows presenting the geotagged media via a map. Some examples of location-based social networking sites include MapWith.Us, Flickr, Panoramio and Picasa. However, presenting the data using online maps is a challenging problem, especially when combined with collaborative mapping. One example of such a project using real-time geotagging is MapWith.Us.

== Privacy Concerns ==
Since real-time geotagging provides the real-time location of the person operating the device, it is possible to track that person using the data that they publish. Where this is a problem, the geotagger can choose to restrict online access to their data by means of access privileges.
