= Sensorvault =

Internal database used at Google

Sensorvault is an internal Google database that contains records of users' historical geo-location data.

It has been used by law enforcement to execute a geo-fence warrant and to search for all devices within the vicinity of a crime, (within a geo-fenced area) and after looking at those devices' movements and narrowing those devices down to potential suspects or witnesses, then asking Google for the information about the owners of those devices.

However, the use of geo-fence warrants has raised privacy concerns, as they can ensnare uninvolved bystanders and undermine individuals' right to privacy. The warrants frequently rely on the assertion that "Americans owned cellphones and that Google held location data on many of these phones" to establish probable causes.

In response to growing concerns, Google has announced plans to end the practice of responding to geo-fence warrant requests for users' location data. The company will be making several changes to the way it handles "Location History" data:

1. Location History data will be stored on users' devices by default, instead of in Google's cloud.
2. The data will be set to delete after three months, instead of being stored for at least 18 months.
3. If users choose to back up their data to the cloud, Google will automatically encrypt it.

These changes are expected to make it much more difficult, if not impossible, for Google to provide mass location data in response to geo-fence warrants.
