= Diol–Beye family murders =

2020 arson murders in Denver, Colorado, U.S.

- Location: Denver, Colorado, United States
- Date: August 5, 2020; 2:30 AM (MT)
- Attack type: Arson
- Deaths: 5
- Injuries: 3
- Victims: Diol and Beye families
- Perpetrators: Kevin Bui, Gavin Seymour, Dillon Siebert
- Motive: Mistaken revenge for stolen phone

The Diol–Beye family murders resulted from an arson attack that occurred on August 5, 2020, in Denver, Colorado. The attack killed five members of Senegalese immigrant families and was perpetrated by three teenagers seeking revenge for a stolen phone, which they had mistakenly traced to the wrong address.

== Background ==
The victims were members of two Senegalese immigrant families living at 5312 Truckee Street in Green Valley Ranch, a neighborhood in northeastern Denver. The house was home to a total of nine people, including the families of Amadou Sow and Djibril "Djiby" Diol.

Kevin Bui, a 16-year-old from nearby Lakewood, had been robbed of his phone and cash while attempting to purchase a gun in July 2020. Using Apple's Find My feature, he traced his stolen phone to 5312 Truckee Street, unaware that such location tracking can be inaccurate by hundreds of miles.

== The attack ==
On the night of August 4–5, 2020, Bui recruited two friends, 15-year-old Gavin Seymour and 14-year-old Dillon Siebert, to help him exact revenge. The three purchased masks from Party City and gasoline, then drove to the target address around 1:00 AM on August 5.

Finding the back door unlocked, the perpetrators entered the house and doused the living room with gasoline before setting it ablaze. Security camera footage from a neighbor captured the three figures fleeing the scene at 2:40 AM as flames erupted from the house.

== Victims ==
Five people died in the fire, all from smoke inhalation:

- Djibril Diol, 29, a civil engineer
- Adja Diol, 23, Djibril's wife
- Khadija Diol, 1, their daughter (two months shy of her second birthday)
- Hassan Diol, 25, Djibril's sister
- Hawa Beye, 7 months old, Hassan's daughter

Three people survived by jumping from second-story windows: Amadou Sow (who suffered a fractured foot), his wife Hawa Ka (who sustained spinal fractures), and their 10-year-old daughter Adama (who had no major injuries.)

== Investigation and legal proceedings ==
The investigation was led by Denver Police Department detectives Neil Baker and Ernest Sandoval. Initially stymied by limited evidence, investigators used several technological approaches:

- Cell phone tower data to identify devices in the area during the fire
- Geofence warrants to Google for location data
- A keyword search warrant requesting information on users who had searched for the address

The breakthrough came when investigators obtained a search warrant requiring Google to provide information on all users who had searched for variations of "5312 Truckee Street" in the 15 days before the fire. This led them to identify Bui and his co-conspirators.

=== Legal proceedings ===
The three suspects were arrested on January 27, 2021. The case raised significant legal questions about digital privacy when defense attorneys challenged the reverse keyword search warrant as an unconstitutional "digital dragnet."

In October 2023, the Colorado Supreme Court ruled that while the warrant was "constitutionally defective" for lacking individualized probable cause, it was ultimately legal due to its narrow parameters and computer-based execution.

=== Sentences ===
All three defendants ultimately accepted plea bargains:

- Kevin Bui (ringleader): Tried as an adult, pleaded guilty to two counts of second degree murder in May 2024, sentenced to 60 years in prison in July 2024. Bui will be eligible for parole after serving 41 years.
- Gavin Seymour: Tried as an adult, pleaded guilty to one count of second-degree murder, sentenced to 40 years in prison in March 2024. Seymour will be eligible for parole after serving 26 years.
- Dillon Siebert: Tried as a juvenile, pleaded guilty to second degree murder in 2023, sentenced to 10 years total (3 years in juvenile detention followed by 7 years in the Colorado Youthful Offender System). Siebert will be eligible for parole after serving 6 years.

== See also ==
- Geofence warrant
- Digital privacy
- Fourth Amendment to the United States Constitution
