= RoboGEO =

RoboGEO is a geocoding software program which synchronizes a Global Positioning System tracklog with a collection of time-coded pictures. A demo is available for download on the Internet. The demo intentionally adds errors of around a kilometer into the data. One main feature of the Software is its capability to imprint Metadata on to the Photo, so is it possible to visualize Coordinates for example.

For other methods of geocoding images, see Geocoded photo.
