= MapWith.Us =

Geosocial networking website

MapWith.Us is a geosocial networking website that allows users to create and share custom maps with an online community. User maps are created by uploading and geotagging media. When media is associated with a location on a map, the media is known as a map article. Map articles may include text, photos, paths, icons, video, web links, and RSS feeds.

== Auto-Geotagging ==
Mount Hood Ski Adventure Map: Geotagged and uploaded with a Sprint BlackBerry Pearl 8130

MapWith.Us implemented automatic geotagging (auto-geotagging) via cell phones in late 2007. The free mobile application allows users at remote locations to create real-time Web-based maps by uploading and geotagging photos with cell phones. The application works by utilizing several different capabilities within a modern cell phone. When an image is captured by the cell phone camera, the built-in GPS tags the image with the present location. The images are afterwards uploaded via the cell phone's Internet data connection to the MapWith.Us website, where they are compiled into photo album map articles.

Maps, including mobile maps, are made private by default but users may publish the map with a password to a select audience, or without restriction.

== Collaborative Mapping ==
MapWith.Us makes every map a collaborative map by default, with per-user data segmentation accomplished via overlays. Each overlay contains a group of map articles that can be toggled on and off by the viewer.

For example, a map might include overlays of a hiking trip with photos and annotations of two hikers, Jane and Bob. The map was created and is owned by a third user, Nancy, but Jane and Bob liked her trail, so they added items. Nancy doesn't know Jane or Bob, but her published map contains their collaborative submissions, with the option of viewing the added content at any time. However, all access rights remain the privilege of the owner, who can detach overlays without directly affecting the user-submitted content.

MapWith.Us also provides standard flavors of collaboration, letting map owners grant other users the right to add, edit, or delete map articles directly on a map's surface.

== History ==
MapWith.Us was created by GeoMonkey, Inc., a Vancouver, Washington, United States-based company. In 2006, GeoMonkey introduced its geosocial website, allowing users to create and share collaborative maps. The first basic form of the tool was developed by Dr. Orest Pilskalns, a professor of Computer Science at Washington State University Vancouver, and students of his CS 420 course, Software Engineering in Practice. With support from the Washington State University Research Foundation, several graduating students (Kevin Karpenske, Adam McDonald, Jacob Moore) continued development on the tool to turn it into a commercially viable service.

GeoMonkey launched its website in 2006 offering numerous tools, for several of which there are patents pending. The site operates under the tagline “A Community Worth Sharing.”

In 2008, GeoMonkey, Inc. renamed its service to MapWith.Us to reflect its mapping roots and practical applications. The company simultaneously added several new services, most prominently its mobile application. The free application was initially available for Sprint’s BlackBerry Pearl 8130, allowing users to geotag and upload photos to their personal maps.
