= CGIS =

CGIS may refer to:

- Canada Geographic Information System, a system designed to assist in regulatory procedures of land-use management and resource monitoring
- Coast Guard Investigative Service, a division of the United States Coast Guard that investigates crimes where the Coast Guard has an interest
