= Garden City Lands =

Park in Richmond, British Columbia, Canada

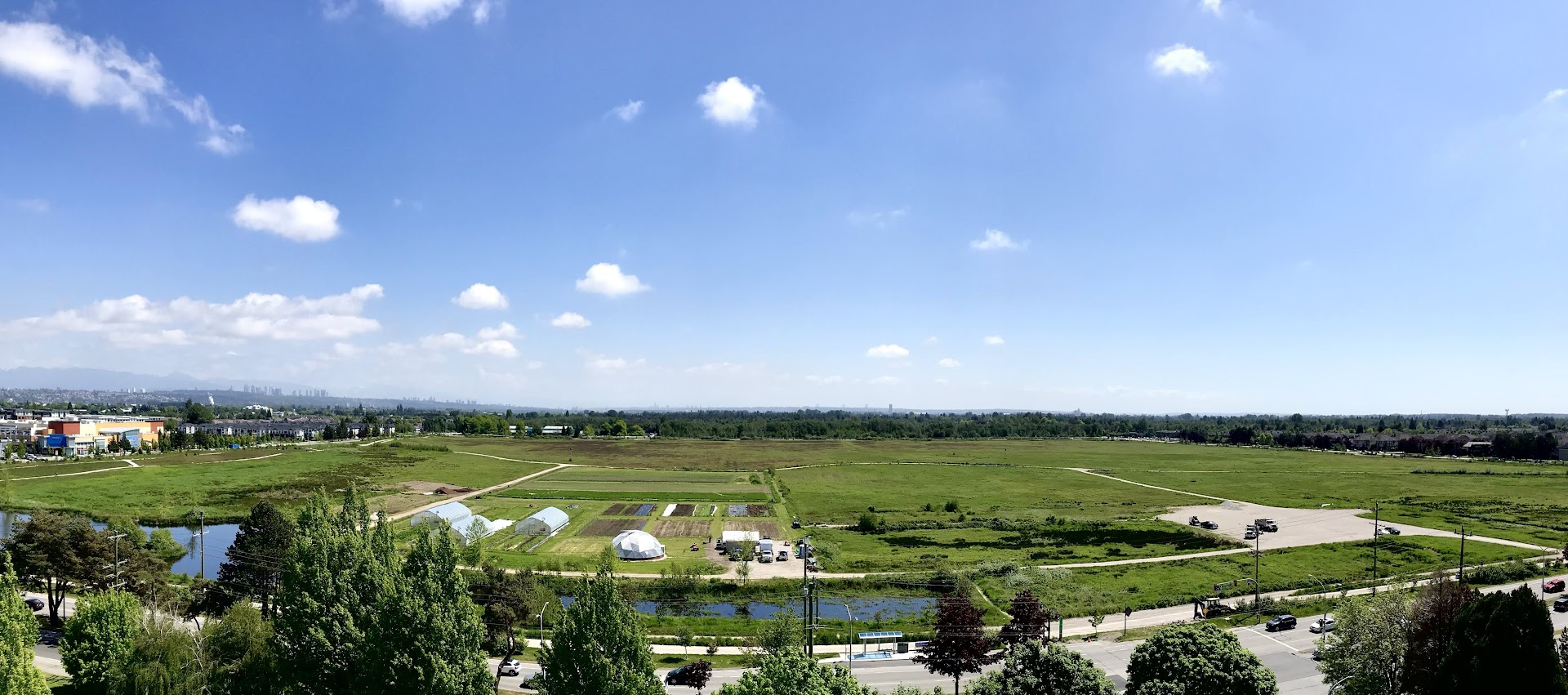
- East-facing view of the Garden City Lands

- Location within Greater Vancouver Regional District
- Type: Urban park
- Location: Richmond, British Columbia
- Coordinates: 49.173701°N 123.119383°W
- Area: 55.2 hectares (136 acres)
- Opened: June 2018
- Operator: City of Richmond
- Status: Open

The Garden City Lands is a large urban agricultural and conservation park in the City Centre of Richmond, British Columbia.

The park is bounded by Westminster Highway, Garden City Road, Alderbridge Way and No. 4 Road and has been within the Provincial Agricultural Land Reserve (ALR) since 1973.

== History ==
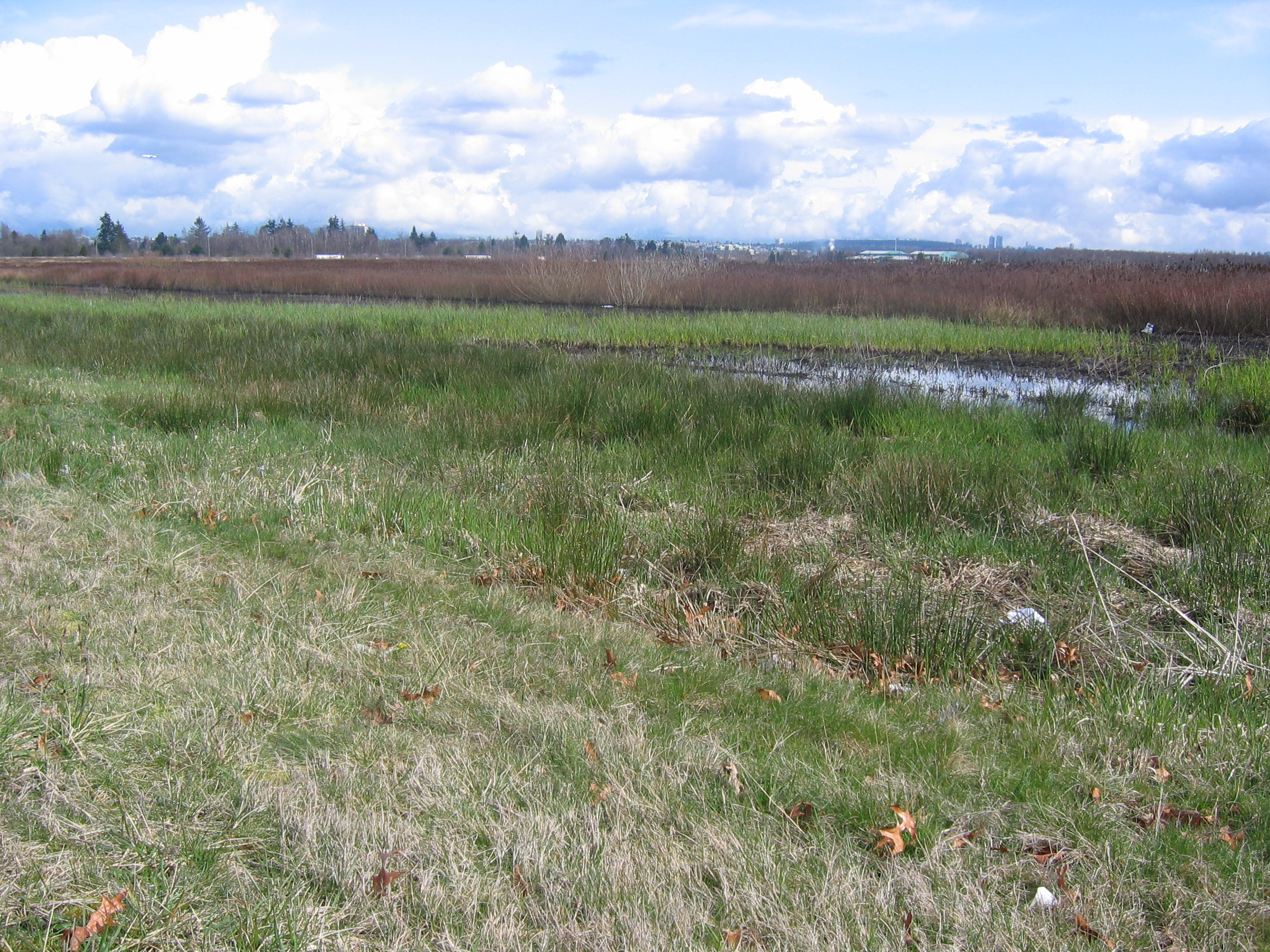
The Garden City Lands in 2008

=== Federal administration and military use ===
In 1903, the Government of Canada acquired the 55.2-hectare (136.5-acre) parcel known as the Garden City Lands, initiating a period of federal stewardship that lasted for over a century. The following year, the Department of National Defence established the Vancouver Rifle Range on the site. Operating until 1928, the range served both civilian recreational functions and competitive tournament hosting.

To accommodate the firing range infrastructure, the natural landscape underwent significant modification, including extensive clearing, drainage engineering, and structural installations. During the First World War, the facilities were repurposed to serve as a tactical training ground for Canadian expeditionary soldiers.

In 1949, the land was adapted as a transmitter site for program requirements of the Canadian Coast Guard. In 2005, the Federal Government of Canada deemed the land as "surplus" to its needs and sold the site to the Canada Lands Company, a federal Crown corporation.

=== Development proposals and municipal acquisition ===
The City of Richmond, Canada Lands Company, and the Musqueam Indian Band entered a 2005 agreement with the federal government that included the intent to remove the land from the ALR for the purposes of high-density development. In April 2008, an application to exclude the land from the Agricultural Land Reserve was made to the Agricultural Land Commission. The application was rejected on 10 February 2009.

On 8 March 2010, Richmond City Council announced a deal had been approved whereby the city would purchase the entire parcel of land from the Musqueam Band and Canada Lands Company for $59.2 million.

The Musqueam band has since brought a lawsuit against the City of Richmond, claiming they sold it under duress. The lawsuit remains dormant and it is the understanding of Coun. Harold Steves that the lawsuit will remain dormant unless the city wants to develop the lands into anything that is not related to ALR use.

=== Public park transition ===
The City of Richmond started their extensive planning for the lands in 2014 and started construction in 2017.

The Garden City Lands opened to the public for the first time in June 2018.

== Agriculture ==
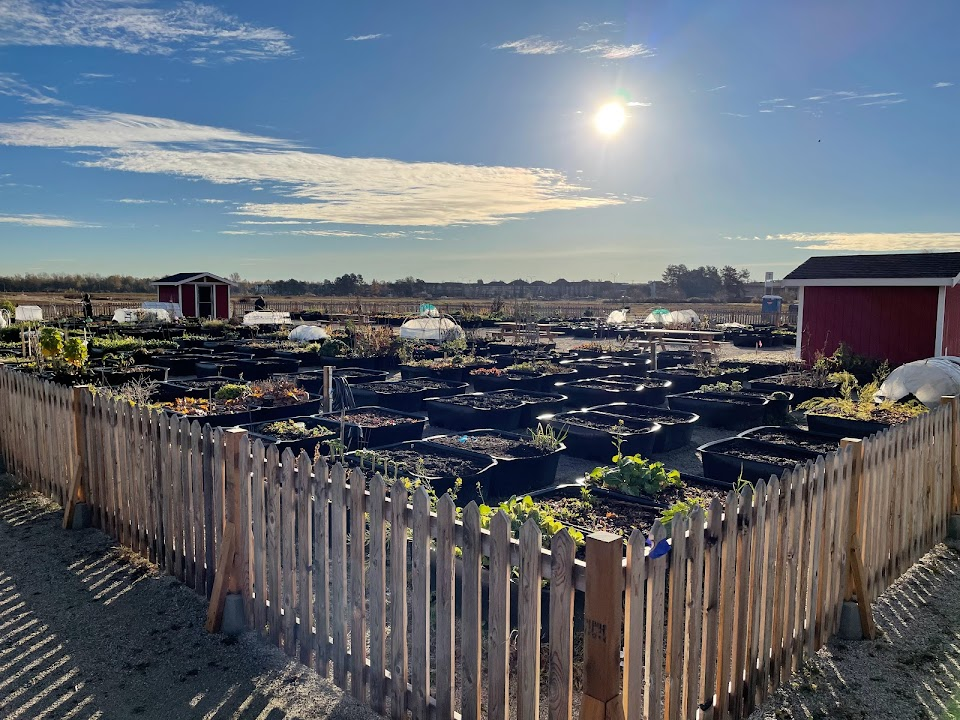
Community Gardens located in the Garden City Lands

Kwantlen Polytechnic University maintains a 3.3 hectare organic teaching farm in the Garden City Lands.

In April 2022, the City of Richmond opened a 200-plot community garden in the Garden City Lands.
