= Azure Maps =

Geographic information system maintained by Microsoft

- Developer: Microsoft
- Release: May 29, 2018; 8 years ago
- Operating system: Windows Desktop, Windows Server, Ubuntu, Red Hat Enterprise Linux, CentOS, MacOS, iOS, Android, Docker, Azure virtual machines, container orchestration platforms
- Type: Location based services, cloud services
- License: Proprietary, commercial software
- Website: azure.microsoft.com/products/azure-maps

Azure Maps is a suite of cloud-based, location-based services provided by Microsoft as part of the company's Azure platform. The platform provides geospatial and location-based services via REST APIs and software development kits (SDKs). The service is typically used to integrate maps or geospatial data into applications.

Azure Maps differs from Microsoft's other enterprise mapping service, Bing Maps, in its pricing model, focus on privacy, and its level of integration into the broader Azure cloud ecosystem.

== History ==
Azure Maps was first introduced in public preview mode under the name "Azure Location Based Services" in 2017, primarily as an enterprise solution. The services was intended to add mapping and location-based functionality onto the existing Azure cloud services suite, seen as a critical part of Microsoft's broader Internet-of-Things (IoT) strategy.

The preview version included APIs which could be used to develop location aware apps for use cases such as logistics and mobility. In 2018, the software was renamed "Azure Maps," and became generally available to the public, and a number of new functions were added, including route calculation, travel time calculation, and incorporation of real-time traffic data and incident information.

Azure Maps was integrated with Azure IoT Central in 2018, which added tracking, monitoring, and geofencing capabilities. A set of mobility APIs on were added in 2019, with applications such as use in public transport apps and shared bicycle fleet management. “Azure Maps Creator,” which converts private facility floor plans into indoor map data, was also introduced in 2019. Some commentators linked these services to Microsoft's broader development of augmented reality products.

In 2020, Azure Maps Visual for Power BI was released, integrating location-based features and mapping capabilities into Microsoft's business intelligence software.

An elevation API (which was later retired), geolocation services, and an iOS and Android software development kit were introduced in 2021.

In 2022, support for historical weather, air quality, and tropical storm data was made generally available and custom styling for indoor maps was also introduced. In 2023, Azure Maps was certified as HIPAA compliant in a move to target healthcare and health insurance companies.

== Functionality ==
=== Geocoding ===
Geocoding is one of the core functionalities of Azure Maps, converting addresses or place names into geographic coordinates. Batch geocoding is used to process large amounts of address data, a function used for route optimization and spatial analysis.

=== Reverse geocoding ===
Reverse geocoding derives human-readable information from geographic coordinates like longitude and latitude, used in navigation and by geographic information systems.

=== Routing ===
Azure Maps uses map data and routing algorithms to calculate the shortest or fastest routes between locations based on factors like vehicle size and type, traffic conditions, and distance. Routing also supports multi-modal routing, which include multiple modes of transport in a single trip, including cycling, walking, and ferries.

This functionality is used for location-based searches and route optimization in applications like fleet management, proximity marketing, and emergency services as well as logistics and delivery, urban planning, ride sharing apps, and outdoor activities.

=== Map visualization ===
The platform supports map visualizations that can be modified to reflect real-time data (including from IoT sensors) as well as historical data patterns. Visualizations include heat maps, street maps, satellite imagery and other custom data layers. Maps are rendered using raster or vector tiles which reduce the load of displaying large data sets or complex maps.

This can be used in various applications in areas like transportation, smart cities, retail and marketing, public health, and environmental monitoring. For example, it can be used for tracking the spread of diseases or measuring the impact of changing climatic patterns.

=== Geofencing and spatial analytics ===
Azure Maps supports polygonal geofencing, which enables the definition of custom geographic boundaries. Geofenced areas can be monitored in real-time for events of interest. For example, an application could send an alert when equipment or persons enter or leave a defined area.

Tools for analyzing historical geofencing data are also available via the APIs for optimization purposes.

== Industry usage ==
Azure Maps' geofencing function has seen usage in the construction industry, designating hazardous areas for safety purposes and sending alerts if anyone enters the area. Private facility maps are used by construction companies for monitoring large construction sites to increase productivity and prevent accidents or damage.

In emergency management, New Zealand based company Beca has used Azure Maps to provide analysis on the impact of earthquakes to users, including information on the severity and location of an earthquake and the impact on affected properties. Alaska's Department of Transportation uses Azure Maps as part of an information system providing weather-related warnings and analytics to road crews.

Airmap, an airspace management platform for drones, uses Azure Maps.

Azure Maps has also been used in conjunction with Azure Monitor for risk monitoring by an insurance company.

Other companies that use or have used Azure Maps include BMW, Banco Santander, Jvion, MV Transportation, C.H. Robertson, Wise Skulls, Tata Consultancy Services, Providence Health and Services, Gas Brasiliano Distribuidora S.A., Shell plc, Persistent Systems, Phase 2 Dining and Entertainment, Symbio, HID, Globant, and Insight Enterprises.

== Partnerships ==
Azure Maps and TomTom have been partners since 2016, and TomTom provides location data to Azure Maps and can process data from Azure Maps for mapping purposes.

In 2021, Azure Maps partnered with AccuWeather to make climatic data available via its APIs, making weather data along all parts of calculated routes available for mobility and logistics purposes.

Microsoft has partnered with Esri, the developer of ArcGIS, and there is cross-compatibility between Azure and ArcGIS so that data from Azure Maps can be integrated into ArcGIS and vice versa.

Azure Maps partnered with Moovit in 2019, a startup providing software that interfaces with public transport data. Moovit's database on global public transit networks, including information on which stations and facilities are wheelchair accessible, was linked to Azure Maps. This service was noted for its use increasing accessibility to public transport for the visually impaired by means of voice activated route planning assistance.

NORAD has used some Azure Maps functions for their NORAD Tracks Santa website during Christmas holidays.

== Components ==
=== REST APIs ===
Various APIs cover the major functionalities across Azure Maps:

- Data registry API
- Geolocation API
- Render API
- Route API
- Search API
- Spatial API
- Time zone API
- Traffic API
- Weather API

=== SDKs ===
Azure Maps SDKs uses MapLibre-style specifications and open source MapLibre GL-based libraries as a rendering engine. The Web SDK is used for developing web apps with maps and location-based data and functionality. It includes a map control module as well as modules with drawing tools. It also supports Azure Maps Creator and various spatial data formats.

The platform also includes a set of REST SDKs for developers integrating Azure Maps REST APIs into Python, C#, Java or JavaScript applications.

Azure Maps also includes Android and iOS SDKs used for developing applications for Android and Apple devices.

=== Azure Maps Creator ===
Azure Maps Creator is a tool for generating custom maps for locations like large office complexes, construction sites, or university campuses. These maps can then be integrated into applications and used with other Azure Maps functions for purposes such as wayfinding and maintenance and security in building automation contexts.

=== Azure Maps Visual for Power BI ===
Azure Maps is integrated with Microsoft Power BI, a graphical tool for producing data visualizations. Since July 2020, Power BI can be used in conjunction with Azure Maps for developing map-based data visualizations. This functionality entered general availability in May 2023.

== See also ==
- Bing Maps
- Geographic information system software
