= Nikon Coolpix P6000 =

Digital camera model

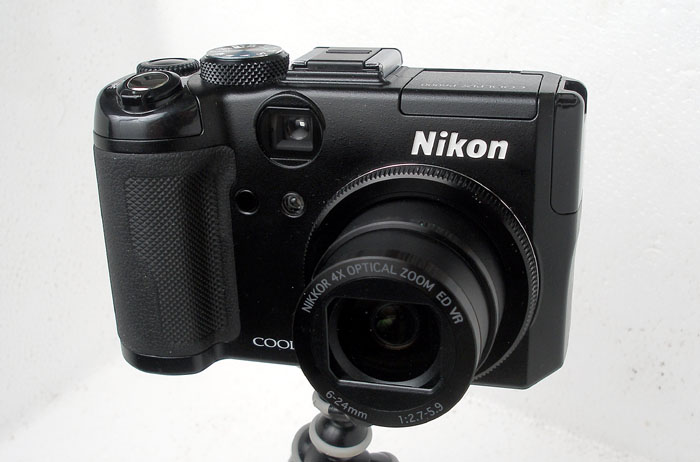
- Maker: Nikon

Lens
- Lens: NIKKOR ED Glass Lens; 4X Wide-Angle Optical Zoom

Sensor/medium
- Sensor: CCD
- Maximum resolution: 13.5 million pixels 4224 x 3168
- Film speed: 64–6400
- Storage media: SD – SDHC Memory cards

Viewfinder
- Viewfinder: Optical

General
- LCD screen: 2.7 inch Wide Viewing Angle TFT-LCD; 230000 Dots
- Battery: EN-EL5 Lithium-ion Battery (SAME AS IN THE P5100)
- Dimensions: Height: 2.6 in (66 mm); Width: 4.2 in (107 mm); Depth: 1.7 in (43 mm)
- Weight: 0.240 kg (0.53 lb)

The Coolpix P6000 is a digital camera introduced by the Nikon Corporation in August 2008.

The built-in GPS (to support geocoding photos automatically) is a first in its price-range. The Ethernet port is also an unusual feature, but the camera is configured to only allow access to Nikon's My Picturetown online photo service. The P6000 was succeeded in 2010 by the larger Coolpix P7000 which lacks GPS.

== Features ==
- 13.5 megapixel CCD sensor
- EXPEED Image Processing
- Face-priority AF
- Bright 2.7-inch High Resolution LCD and Optical Viewfinder
- Optical Image Stabilization
- NRW – raw image format
- Active D-Lighting
- USB 2.0
- Built-in GPS receiver for auto-geotagging
- magnesium alloy front panel
- Wireless Optional Remote Control ML-L3 for wireless shutter release
- VGA video

== NRW – raw format ==
The raw image format for the Nikon P6000 is NRW. This format is supported in Windows using the Windows Imaging Component (WIC) and on Mac OS X after installation of the Digital Camera Raw Compatibility Update 2.3. On other systems, it will require special software plugins. Adobe Camera Raw 4.6 included preliminary support, and full support is provided in Adobe Camera Raw 5.2.

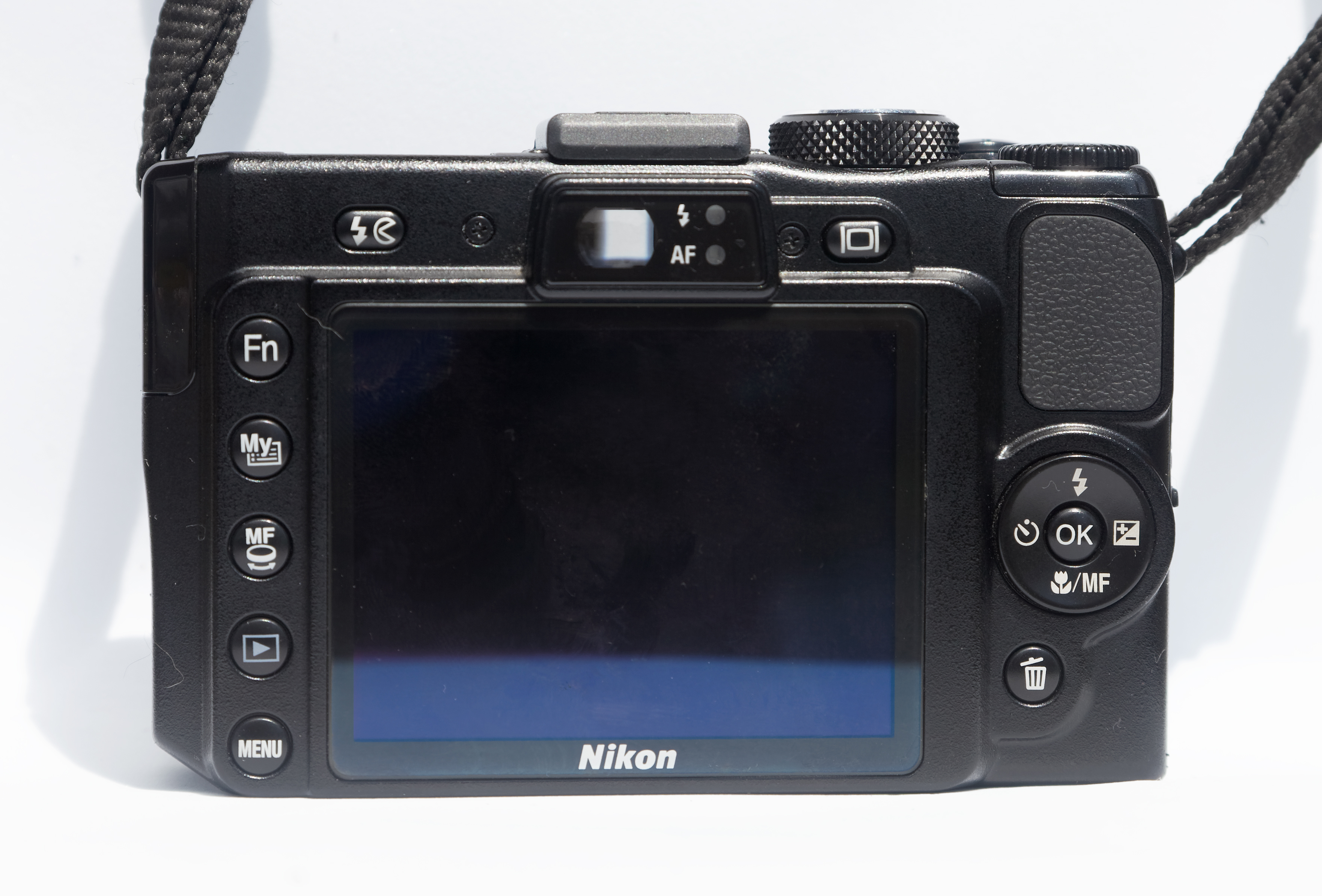
Nikon P6000 Rear.
