= Reverse search warrant =

Type of search warrant

A reverse search warrant is a type of search warrant used in the United States, in which law enforcement obtains a court order for information from technology companies to identify a group of people who may be suspects in a crime. They differ from traditional search warrants, which typically apply to specific individuals. Geo-fence warrants, which seek data on mobile phone users who were in a specific location at a given time, and keyword warrants, which request information on users who searched specific phrases, are two types of reverse search warrants.

== History ==
Reverse location warrants were first used in 2016, and have become increasingly widely used by United States law enforcement. Google reported that it had received 982 reverse location warrants in 2018, 8,396 in 2019, and 11,554 in 2020. A 2021 transparency report showed that 25% of data requests from law enforcement to Google were geo-fence data requests. Google is the most common recipient of reverse location warrants and the main provider of such data, although companies including Apple, Snapchat, Lyft, and Uber have also received such warrants.

== Types ==
=== Geo-fence warrant ===
Geo-fence warrants, also called reverse location warrants, seek to compel data from search engine companies and other technology companies that collect mobile location data, to determine which users may have been in a specific location at a given time.

=== Keyword warrant ===
Keyword search warrants seek to compel search engine companies to release data on users who have searched specific phrases—for example, an address that was later the location of a crime. Keyword warrants are comparatively rare but have been used to request data from companies including Google, Microsoft, and Yahoo since at least 2017.

=== Genealogy database warrants ===
Companies that collect DNA data have received warrants from law enforcement seeking to access their databases. GEDMatch and Family Tree DNA have cooperated with such requests, while larger companies like Ancestry.com and 23andMe have stated they would fight such attempts by law enforcement. These warrants attempt to connect DNA samples from crime scenes with data belonging to commercial DNA testing companies. Even if a perpetrator of a crime has not submitted their data to such companies, DNA samples belonging to relatives, even quite distant ones, have been used to identify suspects and criminals.

== Legality ==
Some lawyers and privacy experts have argued reverse search warrants are unconstitutional under the Fourth Amendment to the United States Constitution or unauthorized by the Stored Communications Act, notwithstanding the third-party doctrine (there is no reasonable expectation of privacy for information voluntarily given to third parties). The Fourth Amendment specifies that warrants may only be issued "upon probable cause, supported by Oath or affirmation, and particularly describing the place to be searched, and the persons or things to be seized." Some lawyers, legal scholars, and privacy experts have likened reverse search warrants to general warrants, which are not permitted by the Fourth Amendment because they lack specificity in terms of the place to be searched or the items to be seized. Although most judges have authorized geofence warrants, at least two federal judges have ruled that such warrants violate the Fourth Amendment's requirements of probable cause and particularity.

Groups including the New York Civil Liberties Union and the Surveillance Technology Oversight Project joined state senator Zellnor Myrie and assembly member Dan Quart in 2020 to begin work on legislation in New York that would prohibit both geo-fence and keyword warrants. Groups including the Electronic Frontier Foundation have opposed geofence warrants in amicus briefs filed in motions to quash such orders to disclose geofence data.

== See also ==
- Dragnet (policing)
