= Prime farmland =

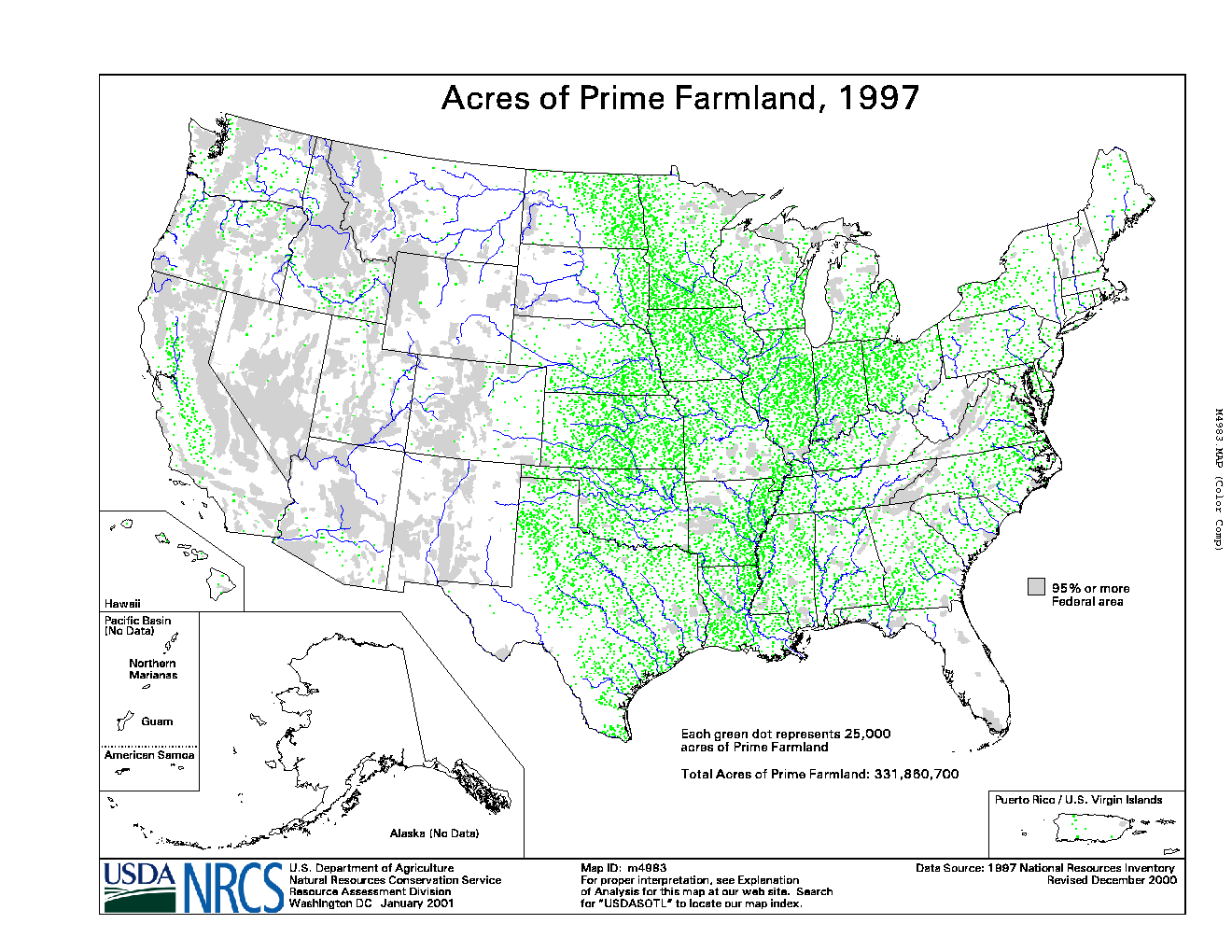
Prime farmland in 1997

Prime farmland is a designation assigned by U.S. Department of Agriculture defining land that has the best combination of physical and chemical characteristics for producing food, feed, forage, fiber, and oilseed crops and is also available for these land uses.

== Definition ==
Prime farmland "has the soil quality, growing season, and moisture supply needed to produce economically sustained high yields of crops when treated and managed according to acceptable farming methods, including water management.".

In general, prime farmlands have an adequate and dependable water supply from precipitation or irrigation, a favorable temperature and growing season, acceptable acidity or alkalinity, acceptable salt and sodium content, and few or no rocks. They are permeable to water and air.

Prime farmlands are not excessively erodible or saturated with water for a long period of time, and they either do not flood frequently or are protected from flooding.

== Overlapping interests ==
Because many of today's major cities were historically founded in agriculturally rich areas, prime farmland tends to be (by virtue of its location) well suited to "growing" houses. Therefore, prime farmland is also prime developable land, and is extremely prone to conversion when in proximity to urban growth areas. This trend is further encouraged by the widespread availability of the private automobile, continuous expansion of roadways, and relatively low-priced gasoline.

USDA prime farmland designation helps growth management and resource conservation efforts in urban growth areas to use zoning and conservation easements in order to preserve prime farmland resources, maintain local economic diversity, and establish green belts. Nonprofit organizations like American Farmland Trust specialize in helping communities use these techniques.

Other designations used by USDA to complement Prime Farmland are Farmland of statewide importance, Farmland of local importance, and Unique farmland.

Unique farmland is land other than prime farmland that is used for the production of specific high value food and fiber crops. It has the special combination of soil quality, location, growing season, and moisture supply needed to produce economically sustained high quality and/or high yields of a specific crop when treated and managed according to acceptable farming methods. Examples of crops are tree nuts, olives, cranberries, citruses and other fruits, and vegetables.

== Other designations ==
Criteria for defining and delineating these lands are determined by the appropriate state or local agencies in cooperation with USDA. The significant difference is that although the criteria are not appropriate outside the state or local area, that these lands approach the productivity of lands in their area which meet criteria for prime farmland and unique farmland.

== Demarcation ==
A universal method for the demarcation of Prime Farmland (PF) soils that considers both science and policy is highly necessary, as when PF soils occupy < 60% of an area their preservation is hard.

== See also ==
- Agricultural Land Reserve
- Conservation easement
- Community land trust
- Periurban agriculture
