= Fishing expedition =

Pejorative term for a non-specific search for information

A fishing expedition is an informal, pejorative term for a non-specific search for information, especially incriminating information. It is most frequently organized by policing authorities.

== Media ==
In the United Kingdom, Abu Hamza al-Masri and Yaser al-Sirri, Jim Davidson, and the late Edward Heath were described in the media as having been subjected to this tactic.

Former friends of the late prime minister Edward Heath complained that Mike Veale, Chief Constable of Wiltshire Police, had mounted a 'fishing expedition' in an 'unsatisfactory and prejudicial' investigation costing £1.5 million which had turned up 'no convincing evidence' that Heath had ever sexually assaulted anyone, according to Lord Hunt of Wirral.

== Law ==
In pre-trial procedure, so-called "fishing expeditions" are massive and aimless calls for all documents related to the litigation: in the United States they are permissible under Federal Rule of Civil Procedure 26 (b) (1). This rule is repeated in many states' rules of procedure: "Parties may obtain discovery regarding any matter, not privileged, which is relevant ... if the information sought appears reasonably calculated to lead to the discovery of admissible evidence." The looseness of the definition of relevant evidence is generally construed to mean "liberal" production.

The only constitutional limitation on the search by subpoena is that it not be hopelessly broad or severely burdensome. If compliance required the production of virtually all the records of a business, or if the burden of sorting through the records would nearly bring the ordinary operation of the business to a halt, the subpoena is invalid. The term is used to characterize the vague or over-inclusive subpoena.

== Science ==
In the sciences, too particular an application of inductive generalisations will sometimes be dismissed as fishing expeditions. The criticism expressed here is that the path from an insufficiently connected observation to actionable theory is held to be too long and therefore fruitless.

== See also ==
- Dragnet (policing)
- Duces tecum
- Presumption of guilt
- Trial by media
- Witch-hunt
