= Unique farmland =

Type of farmland

Unique farmland is land, other than prime farmland, that has combined conditions to produce sustained high quality and high yields of specialty crops, such as citrus, nuts, fruits, and vegetables when properly managed.
