= Geofence warrant =

Type of search warrant

A geofence warrant or a reverse location warrant is a search warrant issued by a court to allow law enforcement to search a database to find all active mobile devices within a particular geo-fence area. Courts have granted law enforcement geo-fence warrants to obtain information from databases such as Google's Sensorvault, which collects users' historical geolocation data. Geo-fence warrants are a part of a category of warrants known as reverse search warrants.

== History ==
Geofence warrants were first used in 2016. Google reported that it had received 982 such warrants in 2018, 8,396 in 2019, and 11,554 in 2020. A 2021 transparency report showed that 25% of data requests from law enforcement to Google were geo-fence data requests. Google is the most common recipient of geo-fence warrants and the main provider of such data, although companies including Apple, Snapchat, Lyft, and Uber have also received such warrants.

== Legality ==
=== United States ===
Some lawyers and privacy experts believe reverse search warrants are unconstitutional under the Fourth Amendment to the United States Constitution, which protects people from unreasonable searches and seizures, and requires any search warrants be specific to what and to whom they apply. The Fourth Amendment specifies that warrants may only be issued "upon probable cause, supported by Oath or affirmation, and particularly describing the place to be searched, and the persons or things to be seized." Some lawyers, legal scholars, and privacy experts have likened reverse search warrants to general warrants, which were made illegal by the Fourth Amendment.

Groups including the Electronic Frontier Foundation have opposed geo-fence warrants in amicus briefs filed in motions to quash such orders to disclose geo-fence data.

In 2024, a panel of the United States Fourth Circuit Court of Appeals considered data acquired from Google’s Sensorvault not to be a search, but non-private business records when users opt-in to Google’s location history. However, upon a rehearing en banc, the Court vacated that decision. In April 2025, the full Court affirmed the judgment solely on the 'good faith' exception, leaving the underlying constitutional question of whether geofence warrants constitute a search unsettled in the Circuit.

However, the United States Fifth Circuit Court of Appeals found that geofence warrants are "categorically prohibited by the Fourth Amendment." The split in Circuits prompted the United States Supreme Court to agree to hear Chatrie v. United States in January 2026.

In late June of 2026, the Supreme Court released its decision in the Chatrie case, ruling that geofence warrants do qualify as searches under the Fourth Amendment because users can reasonably expect privacy in their phone's location data. This decision did not declare geofence warrants unconstitutional, but it did limit the scope of their usage by requiring the full legal scrutiny of a Fourth Amendment search to be applied to them.

== See also ==
- Dragnet (policing)
