= Agricultural Land Reserve =

Collection of agricultural land in British Columbia

British Columbia's Agricultural Land Reserve (ALR) is a collection of land where agriculture is designated as the priority use. Farming is encouraged and non-agricultural uses are restricted.

The ALR was established by the British Columbia New Democratic Party government of Dave Barrett in 1973 to preserve the province's limited farmland from urbanization. The ALR covers 4,600,000 hectares (11,000,000 acres; 18,000 sq mi), or about 4.9% of British Columbia's land base.

There are six ALR administrative regions: South Coast, Interior, Island, Kootenay, North, and Okanagan.

Tax breaks are applicable to property in the ALR, and questions of equity among taxpayers have emerged.

== Characteristics ==
The ALR covers 4,600,000 hectares (11,000,000 acres). It comprises 4.9% of BC's 94,600,000-hectare (946,000 km^{2}; 365,000 sq mi) land base.

Less than a quarter of the land in the ALR is prime agricultural land (1.1% of BC's land area), where prime agricultural land falls into Canada Land Inventory (CLI) survey Classes 1-3. About three quarters of BC's total land is located above a thousand metres in elevation, and the province's mountainous geography means a relatively small share of its land has an agricultural capability.

Approximately 46% of ALR land is under private ownership, and 54% is under public land ownership (provincial, municipal, or federal government).

== History ==
=== Motivation for establishment ===
Before 1973, an estimated 4,000 to 6,000 hectares (9,900 to 14,800 acres) of prime agricultural land was lost each year to urbanization in British Columbia. Recognition that the province had limited arable farmland, and a concern for food security, led the provincial government to introduce the Land Commission Act on 18 April 1973 which created the Agricultural Land Commission (ALC) and established the Agricultural Land Reserve (ALR).

=== Selection of land to be included ===
The boundaries of the ALR are based on the natural characteristics of the land and its climate. All land in Classes 1 to 4 from the Canada Land Inventory (CLI) survey that was not already developed was included in the ALR. (Prime agricultural land falls into CLI Classes 1-3, while Class 4 land is marginal for cultivated field crops.) Class 5 and 6 land was included if it could effectively be used in conjunction with Class 1 to 4 land, and Class 7 land was included if excluding it might allow undesirable intrusion of incompatible uses into agricultural areas.(Land in Classes 5 and 6 is suitable only for perennial forage crops or natural grazing, while Class 7 land has no agricultural capability.)

Starting with CLI maps, and obtaining input from local governments and public hearings, the ALC identified 4,700,000 hectares (12,000,000 acres) to be included in the ALR. There was awareness early on that within some areas (portions of Vancouver Island, for example) the CLI information could be improved. Between 1980 and 1984, the Commission conducted a thorough review of ALR zoning boundaries, using new maps and soil information. Eastern Vancouver Island was given special attention.

Enough land was excluded from the ALR to allow for about 5 years of urban growth. Federal government land was included in the ALR if its biophysical characteristics warranted inclusion, but ALR regulations do not apply to federal government land.

The ALR is administered by the Agricultural Land Commission (ALC), which consists of a board of directors of 11 to 19 members appointed by the Minister of Agriculture and Food. Restrictive land zoning is used to protect agricultural land, and ALC zoning decisions take precedence over land-use bylaws of local governments. The ALC makes decisions chiefly on land removal (exclusion) or addition (inclusion); subdivision; and non-farm land use. Decisions are based on how an application supports the ALC's mandate "to preserve agricultural land" and "to encourage farming on agricultural land".

=== Notable mandate changes ===
The primary role of the ALC was to preserve agricultural land, but the original legislation also gave the ALC responsibility for establishing green belt, land bank, and park land reserves. This responsibility was removed in 1977. (The ALC had to purchase (or otherwise acquire) these lands before designation. By contrast, land in the ALR could be determined without purchase using traditional zoning tools.)

In 1988 golf courses became a permitted land use, but after 1992 they once again required approval.

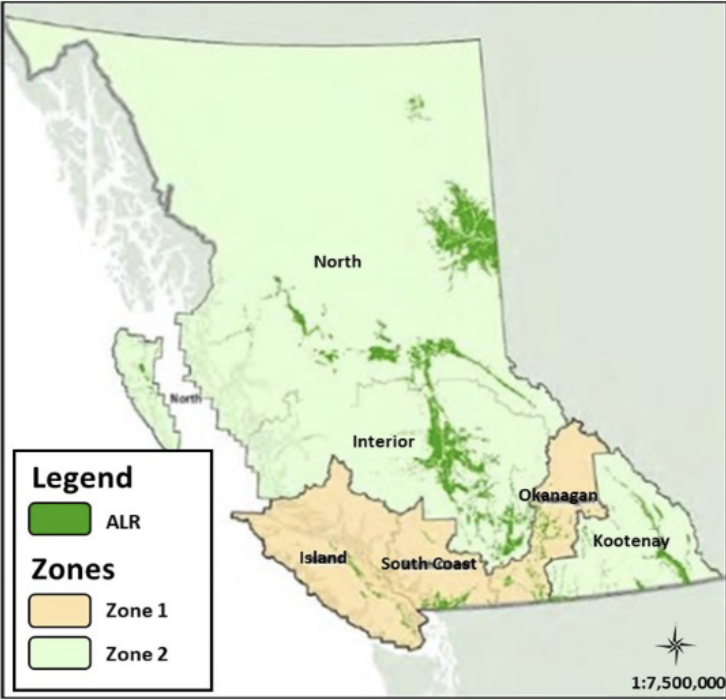
British Columbia's Agricultural Land Reserve (ALR) land area and two administrative zones, 2014–2019

On May 29, 2014, the BC Liberal government of Christy Clark split the ALR into two zones: Zone 1 (Island, Okanagan, South Coast) and Zone 2 (North, Kootenay, Interior). The ALR regulations were viewed as a burden to farmers who owned agricultural land of poor capability. To give owners in Zone 2 more flexibility to earn non-farm income from their land, the ALC's Zone 2 land-use decision factors were broadened to include economic, cultural and social values. On November 20, 2018, NDP premier John Horgan reversed the Zone 2 split, returning the ALR to a single zone under the original criteria.

As of September 2020, private landowners could no longer apply directly to the ALC for the removal of their land from the ALR. Although private landowners may ask their local government for such removal, they must rely on the local government to make the removal application.

== Taxation of ALR land ==
=== School tax exemption ===
Whether or not their land is used for farming, there is a 50% tax exemption to ALR land owners for school, hospital, and other property taxes (for example, TransLink taxes in Metro Vancouver). A Kwantlen Polytechnic University study notes this tax exemption encourages ownership but not farming of ALR land.

A study of the Greater Vancouver area (Metro Vancouver) finds the main beneficiaries of the exemption are properties in the ALR classified as "Residential". Since these properties are not used for farming, the study recommends removal of the exemption so as to maintain equity across residential land owners inside and outside of the ALR.

=== Property taxes ===
Property tax tends to be lower on land located within the ALR, even if the land is not farmed. This is because a property is assessed based on the market value of the land taking into account its "highest and best use" and comparable rural property values. A property's highest and best use is constrained by ALR land use and subdivision restrictions. Therefore, land within the ALR typically has a lower value, even when zoned Residential, Commercial, or Industrial. A study for Metro Vancouver found that for a 5-acre property assessed as Residential in Langley (that does not have "farm status") which pays $13,656 in property tax, a comparable property assessed as Residential in the ALR would pay $3,880 in property tax. The study notes that questions of equity among taxpayers have emerged, since residential and commercial uses within the ALR create demand for services that are financed by local governments through property taxes (utilities, transit, police, fire and emergency services).

== Agricultural-industrial structures on the ALR ==
Structures and farm-related commercial and industrial uses are restricted, but permitted in the ALR to provide agriculture-related economic opportunities for farmers. A 2020 report prepared for the BC government recommended setting aside up to a maximum of one quarter of one percent of the province's ALR land to create a new category of agricultural-industrial farmland. To counter concerns about allowing structures on arable farmland, converted land would be of low soil quality, ill-suited for farming (CLI Classes 4-7).

In 2022, ALR regulations were amended to promote the agricultural-technology industry by allowing crops grown on vertically stacked shelves. The change aimed to cut energy costs and greenhouse gas emissions, improve farm efficiency, and help with labour shortages.

== Controversies ==
=== Establishment of the ALR ===
Thousands of farmers protested the creation of the ALR, because they opposed the restrictions the ALR imposes on what landowners can do with their own land. The restrictions interfere with their private property rights, and thereby reduce land values. Forty years later, support among farmers and ranchers became more widespread, though not unqualified, according to the executive director of the BC Agriculture Council.

=== "Monster" houses ===
In 2017, a Richmond city councillor said he did not want "big houses on small farms." So-called "monster homes" were being built on Richmond's ALR land, where the average house size surged to 12,087 square feet (1,122.9 m^{2}) in 2015, compared with 7,329 square feet (680.9 m^{2}) in 2010. Former ALR chairman Frank Leonard said such houses are a huge problem in some areas such as Richmond, since farm land is "essentially lost" when someone buys ALR land and builds "a 10,000-square-foot [930 m^{2}] mansion plus tennis court, pool and outbuildings". Also, while land-use bylaws do not allow hotels on agricultural land, there were reports of large buildings being constructed in Richmond that were essentially private luxury hotels.

In response, in 2018 the provincial government introduced a 500-square-metre (5,400 sq ft) size limit for the primary residence built on the ALR. The BC Farmland Owners Association opposed the law saying the government did not consult them adequately, and that a limit of 500 square metres would not allow enough space for what are often family-owned businesses. Restrictions were later eased so that, effective 31 December 2021, as well as a principal residence with floor area of 500 square metres (5,400 sq ft) or less, property owners were allowed one residence with a total floor area of 90 square metres (970 sq ft) or less (186 m^{2} [2,000 sq ft]) on a property 40 ha [99 acres] or larger), if permitted by local government bylaw. Further, a secondary suite could be located in the principal residence. Also, the requirement was removed that additional residences must be used by the landowner or immediate family members. As before, the ALC could approve additional residences if they were for farm use.

=== Tax breaks ===
A 2016 an investigative report by The Globe and Mail newspaper found that as prices of suburban farm properties soared in tandem with Vancouver's residential real estate market, the tax advantages of ALR property increased. The study found significant differences between market prices and the provincial assessments for 122 properties examined. In one example, a property located on the ALR paid about $5,300 in property tax while a residential property in the same municipality with the same market value would pay roughly $77,000. The story also noted a tax break associated with the province's new 15% tax on real estate purchased by foreign buyers. The tax applies only to the selling price of the farmhouse, while the ALR land purchase is tax-free.

=== Favourable treatment for producers of alcohol products ===
There has been criticism of inconsistency in how farm policies are applied, in terms of special treatment for producers of wine and other alcohol products. In one instance, a farmer who wanted to serve the produce of their farm in a restaurant needed to produce alcohol, since food and beverage service is permitted in the ALR if the farm produces an alcohol product.

== See also ==
- Greenbelt (Golden Horseshoe), a similar reserve in Ontario.
- Williamson Act, a similar system for California.
