= Location inference =

Location inference is the method of identifying the location profiles of users on social media platforms such as Twitter and Facebook from their message content, friends' network and social interaction even when they did not explicitly disclose such on their account profiles or geotag their messages.

Applications of location inference includes disaster management such as locating victims of earthquakes, consumer profiling for targeted advertising, tailored news content and for law enforcement such as detection of cyberbullying culprits.
