= Williamson Act =

California law

The Williamson Act of the US state of California (officially, the California Land Conservation Act of 1965) is a California law which provides relief of property tax to owners of farmland and open-space land in exchange for a ten-year agreement that the land will not be developed or otherwise converted to another use. The motivation for the Williamson Act is to promote voluntary land conservation, particularly farmland conservation. In 2010, legislation was passed by the California State Senate and State Assembly and sent to the governor to be signed in the form of Senate Bill 1142. The bill was created to provide a relief stream of funding for the Williamson Act.

== See also ==
- Agricultural conservation easement

== External references ==
- Williamson Act Program (California Department of Conservation)
- California code section 51200 (California Land Conservation Act of 1965)
