= Dual Independent Map Encoding =

Encoding scheme for storing geographical data

Dual Independent Map Encoding (DIME) is an encoding scheme developed by the US Bureau of the Census for efficiently storing geographical data. The committee behind the case study that eventually resulted in DIME was established in 1965, although the term DIME itself was coined by George Farnsworth in August 1967. The file format developed for storing the DIME-encoded data was known as Geographic Base Files (GBF). The Census Bureau replaced the data format with Topologically Integrated Geographic Encoding and Referencing (TIGER) in 1990.

== See also ==
- Geographic information system
