= Canada Land Inventory =

Multi-disciplinary land inventory of rural Canada

The Canada Land Inventory (CLI) is a multi-disciplinary land inventory of rural Canada.

Conceptualized in the early 1960s by the Department of Forestry and Rural Development (later the Department of Energy, Mines and Resources), the CLI was a federal-provincial project that lasted from 1963 to 1995 and produced maps which indicated the capability of land to sustain agriculture, forestry, recreation and wildlife; its geographic extent was all of Canada except the North (i.e. below the tree line).

CLI used a common classification scheme and common mapping scales (1:50K 1:250K and 1:1 million). Land capability for agriculture, forestry, land-use, recreation, wildlife (ungulates and waterfowl) were mapped The large amount of data generated by the CLI saw the early adoption of the world's first geographic information system (GIS), called the Canada Geographic Information System (CGIS).

Since 1995, the CLI agriculture data have been taken over by the Department of Agriculture to continue rating agricultural land capability. The CLI in this modified form consists of a soil survey with rankings from 1 to 7, with Class 1 soil having no limitations for arable crop production and Class 7 having no capability for agricultural activities. Classes 1-3 are considered prime agricultural land, and are protected by land use policies in certain provinces, including Ontario. Classes 2-6 have certain limitations for arable crop production, denoted by sub-classes which specify the limitations of the soil (for example, excessive water, adverse climate, stoniness). The results are mapped on 1:250,000 NTS grids.
