= Dragnet (policing) =

System of coordinated measures for apprehending criminals or suspects

A dragnet is any system of coordinated measures for apprehending criminals or suspects; including road barricades and traffic stops, widespread DNA tests, and general increased police alertness. The term derives from a fishing technique of dragging a fishing net across the sea bottom, or through a promising area of open water.

While a dragnet can refer to any kind of focused police presence, the traditional definition involves defining an area (such as a building or a city block) or category (such as those of a specific ethnic group within an area) and conducting at least a brief investigation of each person within. Thus, if a criminal is traced to a specific location, everyone in that location might be searched for incriminating evidence. Since the 1950s, such "dragnets" have generally been held to be unconstitutional as unreasonable search and seizure actions in the United States.

While traditional "stop and frisk" dragnets have largely fallen into disuse, New York's strategy for controlling serious crime by stopping many of those loitering in areas that such loitering is thought to be associated with lesser crimes has been called a dragnet. Similarly, controversy remains over other activities held to be dragnets as well. An active area of legal controversy, for example, is that of warrantless wiretaps. If all cell phones are monitored by machine for certain words or phrases thought to be associated with terrorism, and the results are used to cue focused investigations, the American Civil Liberties Union argues that to constitute a kind of dragnet.

A large, highly publicized dragnet occurred in and around Boston after the 2013 marathon race bombing. A dragnet that caught worldwide attention was conducted by French law enforcement after the Charlie Hebdo shooting, which killed twelve people in January 2015.

== See also ==
- Dragnet (franchise), American radio, television, and motion-picture series
- Fishing expedition
- Geo-fence warrant
- Police raid
- Roadblock
