= Place code =

A P-code, short for place code, is a kind of geocode used mostly by emergency response teams. It provides unique identifiers to thousands of locations and administrative units in a humanitarian operation. The p-codes are represented by combinations of letters and/or numbers to identify a specific location or feature on a map or within a database. These codes provide a systematic means of linking data to an unambiguous location. Any information that is tagged with P-codes can be combined and analyzed with any other p-coded data. The p-codes for a country can be found in the Common Operational Datasets, which are standard geographic references for the humanitarian community provided by UN OCHA:
