= Canada Geographic Information System =

Early geographic information system developed for the Government of Canada

The Canada Geographic Information System (CGIS) was an early geographic information system (GIS) developed for the Government of Canada beginning in the early 1960s. CGIS was used to store geospatial data for the Canada Land Inventory and assisted in the development of regulatory procedures for land-use management and resource monitoring in Canada.

At that time, Canada was beginning to realize problems associated with its large land mass and attempting to discern the availability of natural resources. The federal government decided to launch a national program to assist in management and inventory of its resources. The simple automated computer processes designed to store and process large amounts of data enabled Canada to begin a national land-use management program and become a foremost promoter of geographic information systems (GIS).

CGIS was designed to withstand great amounts of collected data by managing, modeling, and analyzing this data very quickly and accurately. As Canada presented such large geospatial datasets, it was necessary to be able to focus on certain regions or provinces in order to more effectively manage and maintain land-use. CGIS enabled its users to effectively collect national data and, if necessary, break it down into provincial datasets. Early applications of CGIS benefited land-use management and environmental impact monitoring programs across Canada.

== Development ==
In 1960, Roger Tomlinson was working at Spartan Air Services, an aerial survey company based in Ottawa, Ontario. The company was focused on producing large-scale photogrammetric and geophysical maps, mostly for the Government of Canada. In the early 1960s, Tomlinson and the company were asked to produce a map for site-location analysis in an east African nation. Tomlinson immediately recognized that the new automated computer technologies might be applicable and even necessary to complete such a detail-oriented task more effectively and efficiently than humans. Eventually, Spartan met with IBM offices in Ottawa to begin developing a relationship to bridge the previous gap between geographic data and computer services. Tomlinson brought his geographic knowledge to the table as IBM brought computer programming and data management.

The Government of Canada began working towards the development of a national program after a 1962 meeting between Tomlinson and Lee Pratt, head of the Canada Land Inventory (CLI). Pratt was charged with creation of maps covering the entire region of Canada's commercially productive areas by showing agriculture, forestry, wildlife, and recreation, all with the same classification schemes. Not only was the development of such maps a formidable task, but Pratt understood that computer automation may assist in the analytical processes as well. Tomlinson was the first to produce a technical feasibility study on whether computer mapping programs would be a viable solution for the land-use inventory and management programs, such as CLI. He is also given credit for coining the term "geographic information system" and is recognized as the "Modern Father of GIS."

CGIS continued to be developed and operated as a stand alone system by the Government of Canada until the late 1980s, at which point the widespread emergence of commercial GIS software slowly rendered it obsolete. In the early 1990s, a group of volunteers successfully extracted all of the data from the old computer tapes, and the data made available on GeoGratis.

== See also ==
- Geographic Information System
