= Reverse geocoding =

Resolving coordinates to a readable address or place name

Reverse geocoding is the process of converting a location as described by geographic coordinates (latitude, longitude) to a human-readable address or place name. It is the opposite of forward geocoding (often referred to as address geocoding or simply "geocoding"), hence the term reverse. Reverse geocoding permits the identification of nearby street addresses, places, and/or areal subdivisions such as neighbourhoods, county, state, or country. Combined with geocoding and routing services, reverse geocoding is a critical component of mobile location-based services and Enhanced 911 to convert a coordinate obtained by GPS to a readable street address which is easier to understand by the end user, but not necessarily with a better accuracy.

Reverse geocoding can be carried out systematically by services which process a coordinate similarly to the geocoding process. For example, when a GPS coordinate is entered the street address is interpolated from a range assigned to the road segment in a reference dataset that the point is nearest to. If the user provides a coordinate near the midpoint of a segment that starts with address 1 and ends with 100, the returned street address will be somewhere near 50. This approach to reverse geocoding does not return actual addresses, only estimates of what should be there based on the predetermined range. Alternatively, coordinates for reverse geocoding can also be selected on an interactive map, or extracted from static maps by georeferencing them in a GIS with predefined spatial layers to determine the coordinates of a displayed point. Many of the same limitations of geocoding are similar with reverse geocoding.

Public reverse geocoding services are becoming increasingly available through APIs and other web services as well as mobile phone applications. These services require manual input of a coordinate, capture from a localisation tool (mostly GPS, but also cell tower signals or WiFi traces), or selection of a point on an interactive map; to look up a street address or neighbouring places. Examples of these services include the GeoNames reverse geocoding web service which has tools to identify nearest street address, place names, Wikipedia articles, country, county subdivisions, neighbourhoods, and other location data from a coordinate. Google has also published a reverse geocoding API which can be adapted for online reverse geocoding tools, which uses the same street reference layer as Google maps. The other popular reverse geocoding services utilise various search engines based on OpenStreetMap data.

Reverse geocoding is not limited to streets only, but can also be used to identify a ship in a canal or lake; as it makes more sense to describe a ship location using nautical map identities.

== Privacy concerns ==
Geocoding and reverse geocoding have raised potential privacy concerns, especially regarding the ability to reverse engineer street addresses from published static maps. By digitizing published maps it is possible to georeference them by overlaying with other spatial layers and then extract point locations which can be used to identify individuals or reverse geocoded to obtain a street address of the individual. This has potential implications to determine locations for patients or study participants from maps published in medical literature as well as potentially sensitive information published in other journalistic sources.

In one study a map of Hurricane Katrina mortality locations published in a Baton Rouge, Louisiana, paper was examined. Using GPS locations obtained from houses where fatalities occurred, the authors were able to determine the relative error between the true house locations and the location determined by georeferencing the published map. The authors found that approximately 45% of the points extracted from the georeferenced map were within 10 meters of a household's GPS obtained point. Another study found similar results in examining hypothetical low and high-resolution patient address maps similar to what might be found published in medical journals. They found approximately 26% of points obtained from a low-resolution map and 79% from a high-resolution map were matched precisely with the true location.

The findings from these studies raise concerns regarding the potential use of georeferencing and reverse geocoding of published maps to elucidate sensitive or private information on mapped individuals. Guidelines for the display and publication of potentially sensitive information are inconsistently applied and no uniform procedure has been identified. The use of blurring algorithms which shift the location of mapped points have been proposed as a solution. In addition, where direct reference to the geography of the area mapped is not required, it may be possible to use abstract space on which to display spatial patterns.
