= GIS and hydrology =

Geographic information systems (GISs) have become an important tool in the field of hydrology to study and manage Earth's water resources. The study of hydrology using GIS is important as climate change, population growth, and modern technologies place greater demand on water resources, and water varies spatially and temporally throughout the hydrologic cycle.

The elementary water cycle has inputs equal to outputs plus or minus change in storage. Hydrologists make use of this hydrologic budget when they study a watershed. The inputs in a hydrologic budget include precipitation, surface flow, and groundwater flow. Outputs consist of evapotranspiration, infiltration, surface runoff, and surface/groundwater flows. All of these quantities can be measured or estimated based on environmental data and their characteristics can be graphically displayed and studies using GIS.

== GIS in surface water ==
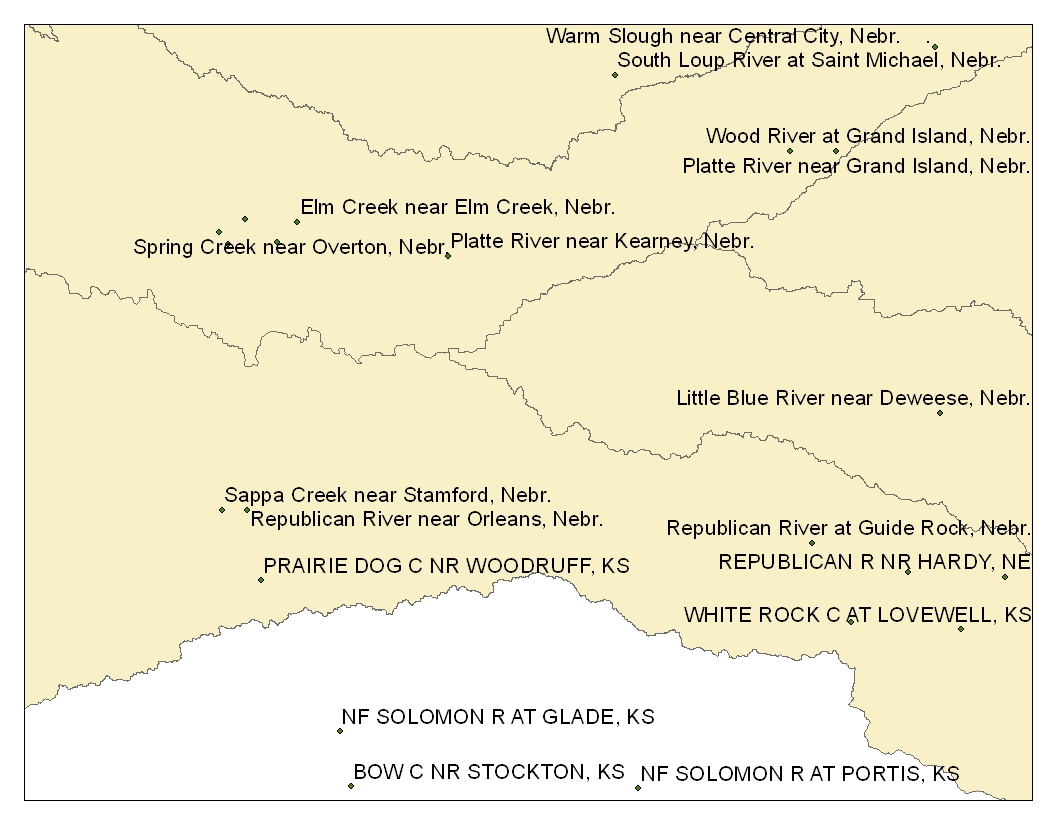
USGS real-time streamflow gage locations with hyperlinks within a GIS to the data

In the field of hydrological modeling, analysis generally begins with the sampling and measurement of existing hydrologic areas. In this stage of research, the scale and accuracy of measurements are key issues. Data may either be collected in the field or through online research. The United States Geological Survey ((USGS)) is a publicly available source of remotely sensed hydrological data. Historical and real-time streamflow data are also available via the internet from sources such as the National Weather Service (NWS) and the United States Environmental Protection Agency (EPA). A benefit of using GIS softwares for hydrological modeling is that digital visualizations of data can be linked to real-time data. GIS revolutionized curation, manipulation, and input for complex computational hydrologic models For surface water modeling, digital elevation model are often layered with hydrographic data in order to determine the boundaries of a watershed. Understanding these boundaries is integral to understanding where precipitation runoff will flow. For example, in the event of snowmelt, the amount of snowfall can be input into GIS to predict the amount of water that will travel downstream. This information has applications in local government asset management, agriculture and environmental science. Another useful application for GIS regards flood risk assessment. Using digital elevation models combined with peak discharge data can predict which areas of a floodplain will be submerged depending on the amount of rainfall. In a study of the Illinois River watershed, Rabie (2014) found that a decently accurate flood risk map could be generated using only DEMs and stream gauge data. Analysis based on these two parameters alone does not account for manmade developments including levees or drainage systems, and therefore should not be considered a comprehensive result.

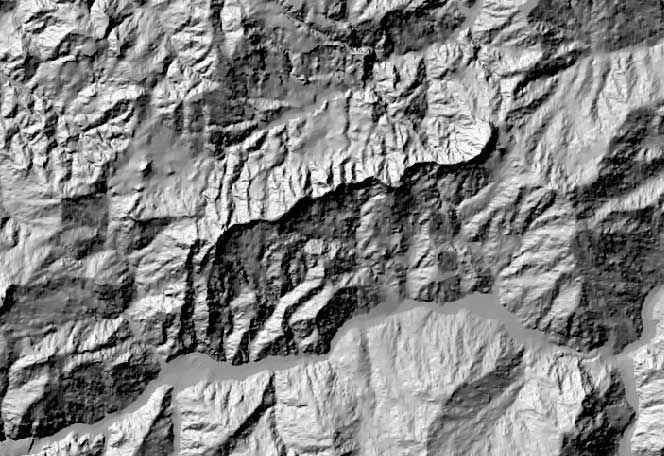
A digital elevation model (DEM) from which a watershed may be delineated within a GIS

== GIS in groundwater ==
The use of GIS to analyze groundwater falls into the field of hydrogeology. Since 98% of available freshwater on Earth is groundwater, the need to effectively model and manage these resources is apparent. As the demand for groundwater continues to increase with the world’s growing population, it is vital that these resources be properly managed. Indeed, when groundwater usage is not monitored sufficiently, it may result in damage to aquifers or groundwater-related subsidence, as occurred in the Ogallala aquifer in the United States. In some cases, GIS can be used to analyze drainage and groundwater data in order to select suitable sites for groundwater recharge.

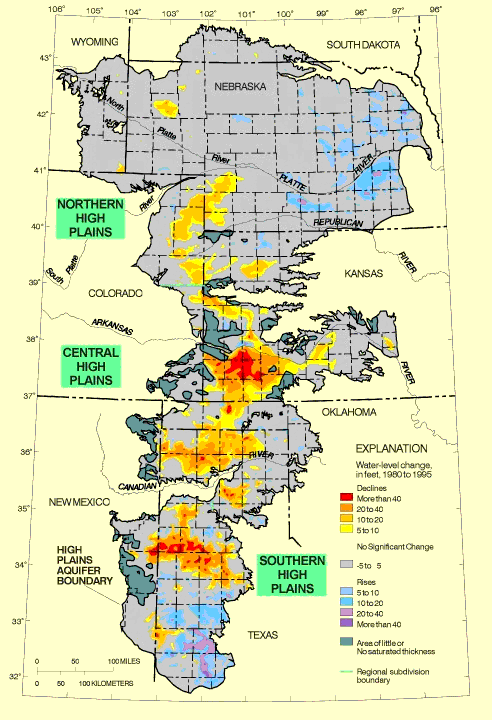
Groundwater level change of the High Plains Aquifer, 1980–95

== See also ==
- GIS in environmental contamination
- Geographic information system
- ArcGIS
- GIS and aquatic science
