= Geometric networks =

A geometric network is an object commonly used in geographic information systems to model a series of interconnected features. A geometric network is similar to a graph in mathematics and computer science, and can be described and analyzed using theories and concepts similar to graph theory. Geometric networks are often used to model road networks and public utility networks (such as electric, gas, and water utilities). Geometric networks are called in recent years very often spatial networks.

== Composition of a Geometric Network ==
A geometric network is composed of edges that are connected. Connectivity rules for the network specify which edges are connected and at what points they are connected, commonly referred to as junction or intersection points. These edges can have weights or flow direction assigned to them, which dictate certain properties of these edges that affect analysis results . In the case of certain types of networks, source points (points where flow originates) and sink points (points where flow terminates) may also exist. In the case of utility networks, a source point may correlate with an electric substation or a water pumping station, and a sink point may correlate with a service connection at a residential household.

== Functions ==
Networks define the interconnectedness of features. Through analyzing this connectivity, paths from one point to another on the network can be traced and calculated. Through optimization algorithms and utilizing network weights and flow, these paths can also be optimized to show specialized paths, such as the shortest path between two points on the network, as is commonly done in the calculation of driving directions. Networks can also be used to perform spatial analysis to determine points or edges that are encompassed in a certain area or within a certain distance of a specified point. This has applications in hydrology and urban planning, among other fields.

== Applications ==
- Routing: for calculating driving directions, paths from one point of interest to another, locating nearby points of interest
- Urban Planning: for site suitability studies, and traffic and congestion studies.
- Electric Utility Industry: for modeling an electrical grid in GIS, tracing from a generation source
- Other Public Utilities: for modeling water distribution flow and natural gas distribution

== See also ==
- Graphs
- Graph theory
- Geographic Information Systems
