= GIS in environmental contamination =

GIS in environmental contamination is the use of GIS software to map and analyze contaminants on Earth, including soil contamination, water pollution, and air pollution. Various GIS methods are used to conduct spatial analysis of pollutants to identify, monitor, and assess them. GIS can use other technologies to advance their process of analysis including remote sensing, LIDAR, GeoAI, and WebGIS. One method includes spatial interpolation, which allows for a more efficient approach to remediation and monitoring of soil and water contaminants. Contamination by metals and other contaminants has become a significant environmental problem after industrialization across many parts of the world. As a result, environmental agencies are placed in charge of remediating, monitoring, and mitigating the soil contamination sites. GIS is used to monitor sites for metal contaminants on Earth to identify high-risk sites where remediation and monitoring are needed.

== GIS in soil contamination ==
Soil contamination from heavy elements can be found in urban environments, which can be attributed to emissions from transportation, industrial activities, and naturally occurring processes, such as background levels (mineral-leaching heavy elements from weathering). Some of the most contaminated soil areas are around the mines, including ones in Slovenia, Bosnia and Herzegovina, and in the United States (Sulphur Bank Superfund Site in California). Soil contamination from heavy metals can pose a threat to human health through direct and indirect contact. Additionally, it can also lead to ecotoxicity, making it difficult for ecosystems to function healthily. In a study area, GIS is used for the analysis of the spatial relationship of the contaminants within the soil.

=== Soil contamination in Slovenia ===
In Idrija, Slovenia, a mercury (Hg) mine had been operating for over 500 years, releasing a significant amount of Hg emissions into the atmosphere. These Hg emissions were absorbed by the surface of the soil, which resulted in the release and diffusion of Hg through the soil's pores. The study aimed to calculate the emission flux of Hg over four seasonal months in one year. To achieve this, a Hg emission model was developed:

lnF_{Hg}=E_{a}/(R*T_{s} )+n*ln[Hg]_{s}+m+0.003*R_{z} Equation 1

in which the F_{Hg} is the flux of Hg emission, E_{a} is the activation energy, R is the gas constant, T_{s} is the soil temperature, n and m are constants, [Hg]_{s} is the Hg concentration, and 0.003* R_{z} accounts for the solar radiation since the solar radiation has the effect on the temperature; hence, the solar radiation has the effect on the emission flux of Hg. Once the Hg concentration data was gathered, a schematic model was prepared for GIS input, which consisted of a digital elevation model (DEM), a satellite land use map, and EARS data. Using the inverse distance weighted (IDW) method from geostatistical tools in ArcGIS 9.3, a raster model of the Hg concentration has been produced for the Idrija area.

The raster model in ArcGIS provided a visualization of the spatial distribution of Hg emissions, showing that the highest Hg emissions were concentrated in the location where the Hg mine had operated. The study found that Hg emissions were highest during the summer month of July, showing a strong correlation between Hg emissions and seasonal changes in temperature and solar radiation.

== GIS in Water Pollution ==
GIS can assist in assessing and mitigating water pollution by providing a visualization of contaminants in an area. The contaminants that are analyzed are either naturally occurring, such as volcanic waste, mineral leaching, or saltwater intrusion. They can also be anthropogenic, such as industrial waste, agricultural runoff, or oil spills. GIS allows for spatial analysis of pollution sources, movement, and impact for different contaminants utilizing different methods, including spatial interpolation, remote sensing, and hydrological modeling. Additionally, statistical models can help predict areas at higher risk of pollution. One of the issues concerning water contaminants is groundwater pollution, which impacts ecosystems and human health.

=== DRASTIC Summary Index Score modeled using GIS ===
Under certain hydrological parameters, some aquifers are more prone to contamination than other aquifers. The parameters that are taken into consideration when calculating the vulnerability of aquifers to contamination are depth to water (factor d), net recharge (factor r), aquifer media (factor a), soil media (factor s), topography (factor t), impact of the vadose zone (factor i), and the hydraulic conductivity (factor c), which together spell out DRASTIC. Furthermore, there is a weighting factor associated with each of the parameters that can range from one to five. In addition, the lower the numbers for the DRASTIC index after the assessment of the aquifer, the lower the risk of aquifer contamination in that area. These seven parameters derive DRASTIC summary index score, which determines which are more prone to contamination than other. The significance of the DRASTIC summary index score is that it shows areas that are more prone; as a result, the state or local authorities, depending on the scale, will place necessary measures in place that would prevent or mitigate contamination of the water supply. Using GIS, a map was developed for the seven counties (Hillsborough, Polk, Manatee, Hardee, Sarasota, DeSoto, and Charlotte) in Florida, which shows the DRASTIC summary index score for the Floridan Aquifer System, Surficial Aquifer System, and Other Rocks aquifer. The developed map is a combination of multiple layers that are stacked on top of each other, as shown in Figure 1.

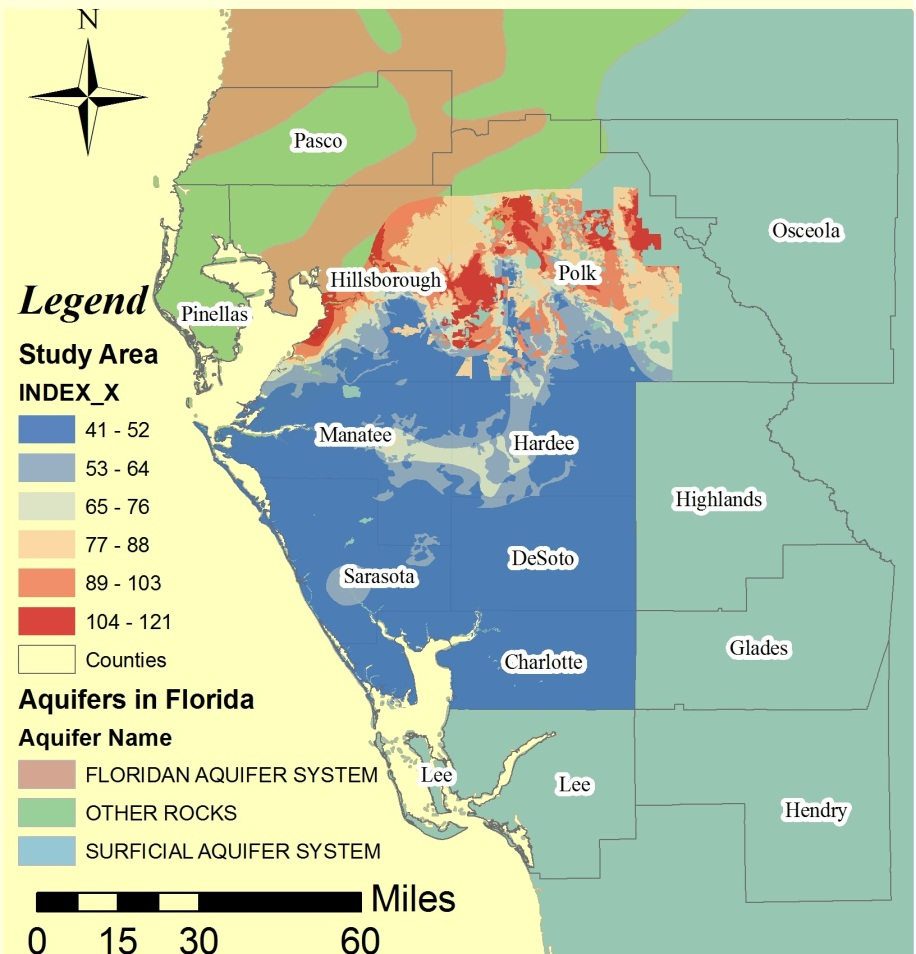
Figure 1: This is the DRASTIC summary index for West Florida. In blue is the least vulnerable area of the aquifer. In red the highest vulnerability.

== GIS in Air Contamination ==
GIS is used to study and monitor air contamination by mapping the spatial distribution of pollutants. Common air contaminants include particulate matter (PM), nitrogen oxides (NO_{x}), sulfur dioxide (SO_{2}), carbon monoxide (CO) ozone (O_{3}) and volatile organic compounds (VOCs). These pollutants can originate from industrial activities, vehicle emissions, and natural events such as wildfires. GIS allows for the analysis of pollutant distribution patterns, exposure levels, and changed over time. This spatial analysis can help public health agencies, researchers, and policymakers assess air quality to identify at-risk populations and support air pollution mitigation strategies.

=== Air Contamination in the Salton Sea ===
Shoreline changes in the Salton Sea, located in Southern California, are monitored using GIS. These changes have significant impacts on air quality and public health in the surrounding area. The Salton Sea, formed in 1905 when the Colorado river flooded a desert basin below sea level, has been heavily polluted by agricultural runoff, which deposited pesticides, fertilizers, and other contaminants into the lake, creating unhealthy conditions for wildlife. The 2003 Quantification Settlement Agreement (QSA) reduced water flow to the Salton Sea, causing it to shrink and expose more of its lakebed, which has become a source of airborne dust contaminated by years of agricultural activity. This led to public health concerns for nearby communities, which are often farmworkers and communities of color, experiencing high rates of respiratory problems. Geographic Information Systems (GIS) and spatial analysis techniques play a crucial role in these efforts by mapping lakebed exposure and identifying areas of greatest risk.

The study, led by researchers from the School of Public Health at Loma Linda University in collaboration with grassroot organizations and the local community, aimed to track shoreline changes on the North Shore of the Salton Sea through the use of historical satellite imagery, balloon mapping, and air quality modeling with the use of ArcGIS and other software. From 2018 to 2021, a camera attached to a weather balloon captured images of the North Shore, which were then compared to satellite images taken from 2002 to 2018, to analyze changes in shoreline over time. Their results showed that the rate of shoreline recession increased following the changes in water management policies. Between 2002 and 2017, the average rate of retreat was approximately 12.5 m (4 ft), but this increased to an average rate of 38.5 m (120 ft) per year between 2017 and 2020. Using predication models, the North Shore is expected to retreat an additional 150 m by 2030 and 172 m by 2041, which will continue impacting public health.

To assess the impact of air quality, a chemical transport model (WRF-Chem) was employed to simulate and predict the emissions of dust pollution, specifically PM10, from the exposed lakebed. The model found that the expanding exposed lakebed is expected to significantly worsen PM10 exposure for local communities, increasing the risk of respiratory health problems for residents around the Salton Sea. This work, utilizing GIS, contributes to the ongoing research, mitigation, and public health issues linked to the shrinking Salton Sea and its exposed sediments that impact air quality.
