= Geo URI scheme =

System of geographic location identifiers

The geo URI scheme is a Uniform Resource Identifier (URI) scheme defined by the Internet Engineering Task Force's RFC 5870 (published 8 June 2010) as:

a Uniform Resource Identifier (URI) for geographic locations using the 'geo' scheme name. A 'geo' URI identifies a physical location in a two- or three-dimensional coordinate reference system in a compact, simple, human-readable, and protocol-independent way.

The current revision of the vCard specification supports geo URIs in a vCard's "GEO" property, and the GeoSMS standard uses geo URIs for geotagging SMS messages. Android based devices support geo URIs, although that implementation is based on a draft revision of the specification, and supports a different set of URI parameters and query strings.

A geo URI is not to be confused with the former website of GeoURL (which had implemented ICBM addresses).

== Example ==
A simple geo URI might look like:

geo:13.4125,103.8667

where the two numerical values represent latitude and longitude respectively, and are separated by a comma. They are coordinates of a horizontal grid (2D). If a third comma-separated value is present, it represents altitude; so, coordinates of a 3D grid. Coordinates in the Southern and Western hemispheres as well as altitudes below the coordinate reference system (depths) are signed negative with a leading dash.

The geo URI also allows for an optional "uncertainty" value, separated by a semicolon, representing the uncertainty of the location in meters, and is described using the "u" URI parameter. A geo URI with an uncertainty parameter looks as follows:

geo:37.786971,-122.399677;u=35

A geo URI may, for example, be included on a web page, as HTML:

<a href="geo:37.786971,-122.399677;u=35">Wikimedia Headquarters</a>

so that a geo URI-aware user agent such as a web browser could launch the user's chosen mapping service; or it could be used in an Atom feed or other XML file.

== Coordinate reference systems ==
The values of the coordinates only make sense when a coordinate reference system (CRS) is specified. The default CRS is the World Geodetic System 1984 (WGS-84), and it is not recommended to use any other:

The optional 'crs' URI parameter described below may be used by future specifications to define the use of CRSes other than WGS-84. This is primarily intended to cope with the case of another CRS replacing WGS-84 as the predominantly used one, rather than allowing the arbitrary use of thousands of CRSes for the URI (which would clearly affect interoperability).

The only justified use of other CRS today is, perhaps, to preserve projection in large-scale maps, as local UTM, or for non-terrestrial coordinates such as those on the Moon or Mars. The syntax and semantic of the CRS parameter, separated by a semicolon, is described at section 8.3 of RFC 5870. Examples:

- The Washington Monument's location expressed with UTM-zone 18N and its standard ID:
  geo:323482,4306480;crs=epsg32618;u=20
- A geo URI for a hypothetical lunar CRS created in 2011 might be:
  geo:37.786971,-122.399677;crs=Moon-2011;u=35

The order in which the semicolon-separated parameters occur is partially significant. Whilst the labeltext parameter and future parameters may be given in any order, the crs and the u parameters must come first. If both are used, the crs must precede the u. While all parameter names are case-insensitive, case-sensitivity of their values must be explicitly described in their specifications (like it is done for crs). Imagining a future new parameter mapcolors, it can be ignored by simpler applications, and the above example is exactly equivalent to:

geo:323482,4306480;CRS=epsg32718;U=20;mapcolors=for_daltonic

The use of the lowercase representation of parameter names (crs u and mapcolors) is preferred.

== Semantics and usual interpretations ==
The Geo URI scheme semantics, expressed in the section 3.4 of the RFC 5870, is not explicit about some mathematical assumptions, so it is open to interpretation. After ~10 years of its publication, there are some consensual or "most frequently used" assumptions.

=== Altitude ===
1. Ocean; 2. Reference ellipsoid; 3. Local plumb line; 4. Continent; 5. Geoid

The syntax of the Geo URI defines coordinates as coordinates = coord-a "," coord-b [ "," coord-c ], where coord-c is optional. The semantic of coord-c for WGS-84 is altitude in meters (specifically the "ground elevation", relative to the current geoid – Earth Gravitational Model – attached to WGS84), and the concept is extended for other coordinates (of non-default CRS).

The RFC explains that "... undefined <altitude> MAY assume that the URI refers to the respective location on Earth's physical surface." However, "... an <altitude> value of 0 MUST NOT be mistaken to refer to 'ground elevation'".

In other words, when an altitude is defined, the measurement is done relative to the geoid (#5; black line in the image), a surface defined by Earth's gravity approximating the mean sea level. When it is undefined, the elevation is assumed to be the altitude of the latitude-longitude point, that is its height (or negative depth) relative to the geoid (i.e. "ground elevation"). A point with a measure "altitude=0" is, however, not to be confused with an undefined value: it refers to an altitude of 0 meters above the geoid.

The use of a geoid stands in contrast to GeoJSON, which uses direct ellipsoid height.

=== Uncertainty ===
Facets of the uncertainty. According to ISO 5725-1: accuracy is the proximity of measurement results to the true value; precision is the degree to which repeated (or reproducible) measurements under unchanged conditions show the same results.

Remembering the example above,

geo:37.786971,-122.399677;u=35

The u=35 part informs the uncertainty. As will be showed, geometrically the uncertainty is a disc of radius u in turn of the point of the geo URI.

Geo URI is not about exact abstract positions, strictly it is a location estimate, and we can interpret it (from RFC 5870 and RFC 5491) as the approximate physical position of an object in the Earth's surface.

The RFC 5870 does not formalize the use of the "uncertainty" term. So, in a coarse-statistical or any non-statistical numerical analysis, the GeoURI uncertainty is a condition number. The statistical meaning is implicit, come from the references of the RFC: the only normative reference with something about uncertainty is the RFC 5491 (section 5). The main informative reference, ISO 6709:2008, not use the term "uncertainty", but use the terms "accuracy" and "precision", which are uncertainty facets and can be interpreted in accordance with ISO 5725-1 (illustrated).

Putting all together, adopting these clues, the usual statistical assumptions, and the explicit definitions of the RFC, we obtain the Geo URI's uncertainty mathematical properties:

1. uncertainty is symmetric: the RFC is explicit, and we can understand it as valid simplification hypothesis. "The single uncertainty value is applied to all dimensions given in the URI" (section 3.4.3). Results in a spherical volume around the point (or a disk by 2D projection).
  By RFC 5491 "locations are expressed as a point (...) and an area or volume of uncertainty around the point".
  - Using RFC 5491, we can suppose that "It is RECOMMENDED that uncertainty is expressed at a confidence of 95% or higher". Therefore, the uncertainty is two standard deviations, 2σ, and it is the radius of the disk that represents uncertainty geometrically.
2. fixed measure unit: the RFC obligate the use of meters as uncertainty measure units, even when coordinates (CRS) use other (like default that is decimal degrees). It is a semantic and a conversion problem: the
3. Gaussian error model: RFC say nothing, we interpreting the phrases "amount of uncertainty in the location" and "the uncertainty with which the identified location of the subject is known", all in the context of the normative reference, RFC 5491 (and the informative references like ISO 6709:2008).
  - adopting standard error model: the model of the most common descriptive statistics modeling.
  - It is imposed, is independent of selection process of uncertainty description, there are no other choices.
4. total uncertainty: it is only one parameter representing "all uncertainty", the uncertainty in the spatial measure and uncertainty about object definition or object's center. It is a sum of random variables. There is no simplification hypothesis defined to reduce it to a one-variable model.

Imagining the location of an ant colony to illustrate:

- the colony is a 3D object at the (exactly) the Terrain surface, so at precise altitude (approximated to a zero uncertainty measure).
- the 3D object has some consensual definition, but it is not precise, so, its uncertainty can not be neglected. This lack of precision can be about the fact that the anthill is hidden under the ground (it is an "estimated object"), or the formal definition of its delimitation, etc. This kind of uncertainty has no correlation with the location (e.g. GPS) uncertainty measure.
  - the disk representing the anthill (as uncertainty of the object) is modeled as 2σ to be a 95% of confidence area.
- the point is a GPS location measure, that is, the "center" of the projection of the 3D object in the 2D surface.

The total uncertainty is the sum of GPS error and object-definition error. The latitude and longitude GPS errors need to be simplified (to a disk) and converted into meters. If the errors were inferred from a different model, they need to be converted to the Gaussian model.

== Unofficial extensions ==
Some vendors, such as Android OS, have adopted extensions to the "geo" URI scheme:

- z: Zoom level for Web Mercator projection scaling. The value is an integer from 1 to 21.
- q: Perform a search for the keyword given around the point. If the location is given as "0,0", search around the current position.
- (label): If the keyword in the q parameter is a coordinate, a parenthetical after it will show a label on it on the map.

Google Maps adopts an unconventional approach to displaying the points: it shows the map for, but does not display a map pin, when a location is given in the standard way. A pin only shows up when given as the query. In other words, to show a pin at the Wikimedia Foundation office, one should not use geo:37.78918,-122.40335 but geo:0,0?q=37.78918,-122.40335.

To add the label in Google Maps, it will be like: geo:0,0?q=37.78918,-122.40335(Wikimedia+Foundation). For other apps, including OsmAnd and Organic Maps, the Google Maps style URI work. Also the label will work even if it does not append to the q parameter, but append to the end of URI, like geo:37.78918,-122.40335(Wikimedia+Foundation), or more like a regular URI: geo:37.78918,-122.40335?z=14&(Wikimedia+Foundation).

== See also ==
- LOC record
- Uncertainty
