= Vincenty =

Vincenty may refer to:

- Thaddeus Vincenty (1920-2002), Polish-American geodesist
- Vincenty's formulae, a fast algorithm to calculate the distance between two latitude/longitude points
