= TI-54 =

Scientific calculator produced by Texas Instruments

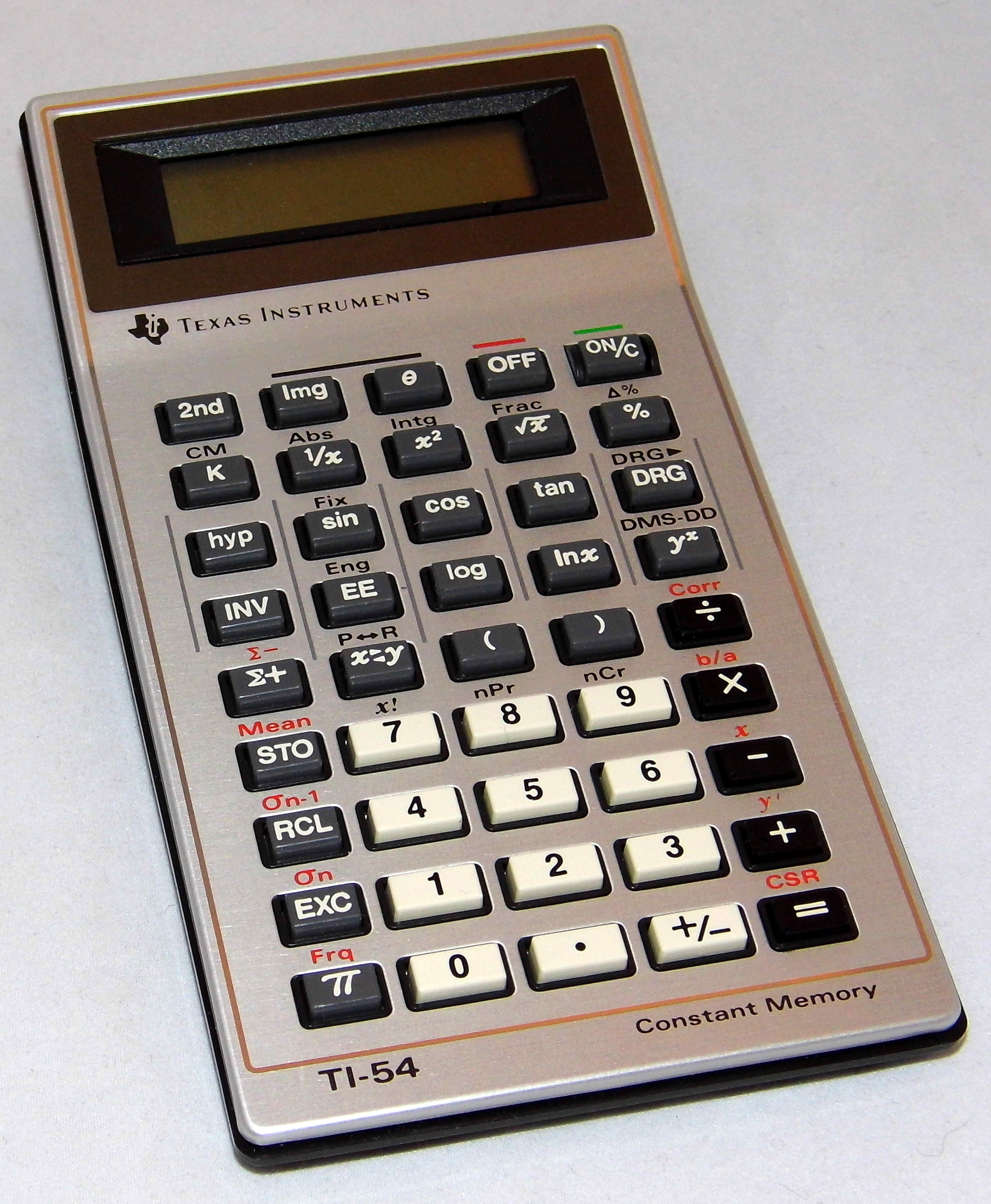
- The TI-54 calculator
- Type: Scientific
- Manufacturer: Texas Instruments
- Introduced: 1981
- Discontinued: 1983
- Cost: 40 USD

Calculator
- Precision: 11
- Display type: Liquid crystal display
- Display size: 8+2

Other
- Power supply: 2 alkaline LR44 batteries
- Weight: 0.106 kg
- Dimensions: 14.7 x 7.9 x 2.3 cm

The TI-54 was a scientific calculator produced by Texas Instruments, primarily marketed towards engineers and science professionals. It was introduced in 1981, and at the time was the only calculator that could deal with complex numbers. It was discontinued in 1983.

The TI-54 touted features such as "built in algebraic functions for both real and complex numbers", "hyperbolic and trig functions for real numbers", and conversion functions such as polar to rectangular, and degrees/minutes/seconds to decimal degrees. It also came with Texas Instruments' Constant Memory feature, which allowed for data storage even after the calculator was turned off.

The TI-54, along with other models in the "slanted series," frequently experienced a hardware defect known as key bouncing, where keystrokes either failed to register or registered multiple times. This issue significantly reduced the reliability of calculations performed on the device. Following a high volume of consumer complaints, Texas Instruments initiated a replacement program, offering users an updated model featuring a redesigned keyboard at no cost.
