= ICBM address =

Hacker slang for geographic coordinates

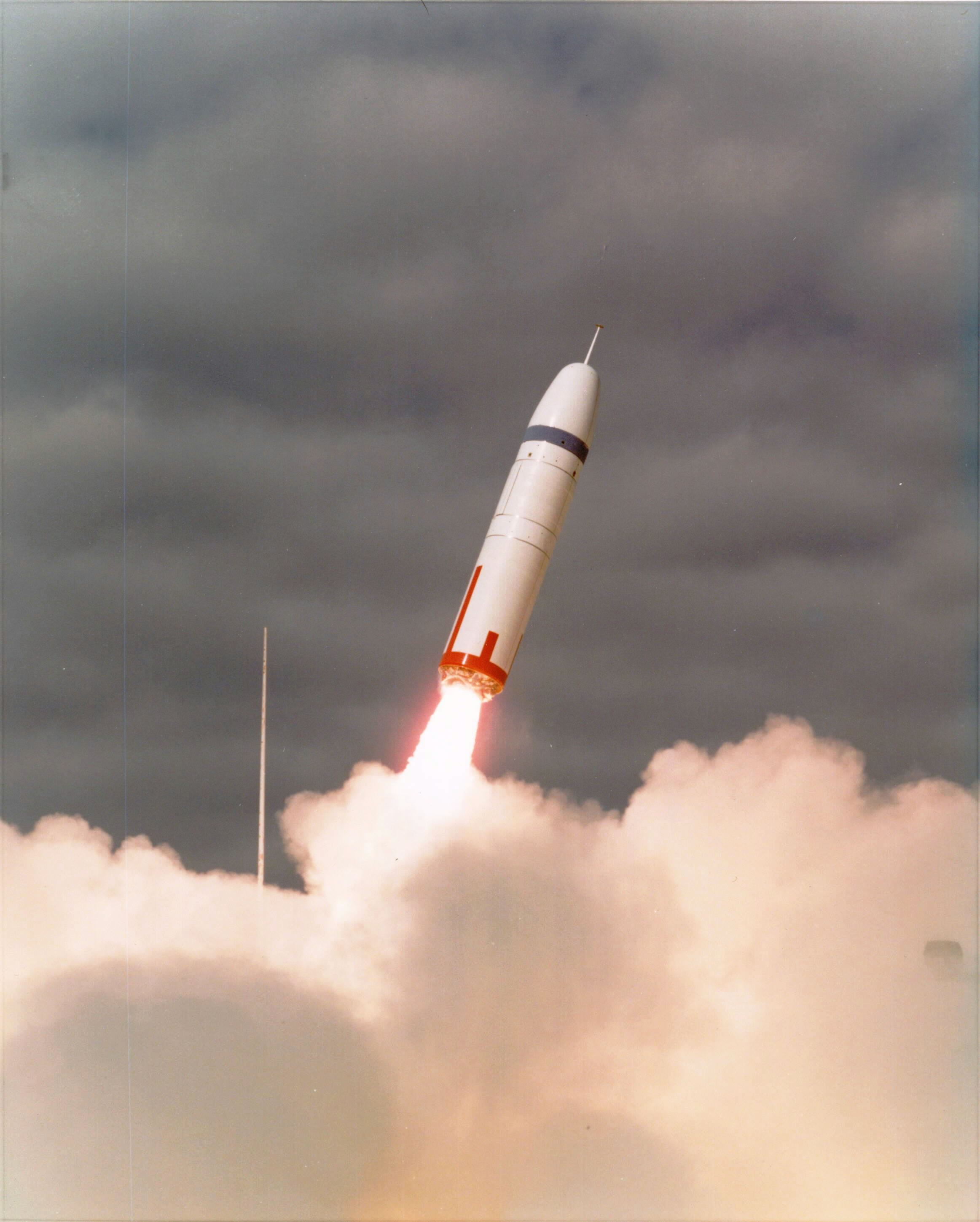
The term ICBM address is derived from the ICBM or intercontinental ballistic missile.

ICBM (intercontinental ballistic missile) address or missile address is hacker slang for one's longitude and latitude (preferably to seconds-of-arc accuracy) when placed in a signature or another publicly available file.

== Origin ==
The form that used to register a site with the Usenet mapping project, before Internet connectivity became commonplace for Usenet sites, included a field for longitude and latitude, preferably to seconds-of-arc accuracy. This was actually used for generating geographically correct maps of Usenet links on a plotter; however, it became traditional to refer to this as one's ICBM address or missile address, and some people include it in their sig block with that name.

A typical tag might read "ICBM Address: 36.8274040 N, 108.0204086 W".

== Modern use ==
Today, using the ICBM method of coordinates is one method of geotagging webpages or other online material. Some projects parse ICBM address included in webpages via meta tags, which can then be used to map out sites added to its database.

Web page uses of <meta name="ICBM" content="12.345, 67.890"> specify the same location as a geo:12.345,67.890 URI.

== See also ==
- Geo URI scheme (an RFC Internet standard)
- Schema.org (schema.org/geo the standard for HTML)
- Geographic coordinate system
- LOC record
- Geo (microformat)
- Geotagging
- Assassination coordinates
