= Geotagging =

Act of associating geographic coordinates to digital media

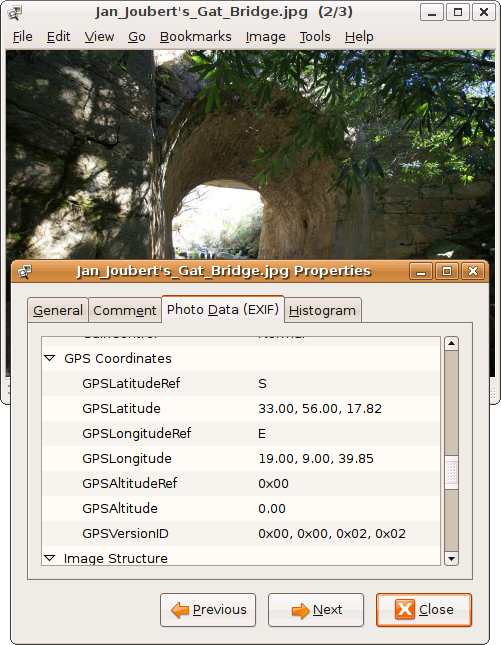
Geotag information in a JPEG photo, shown by the software gThumb

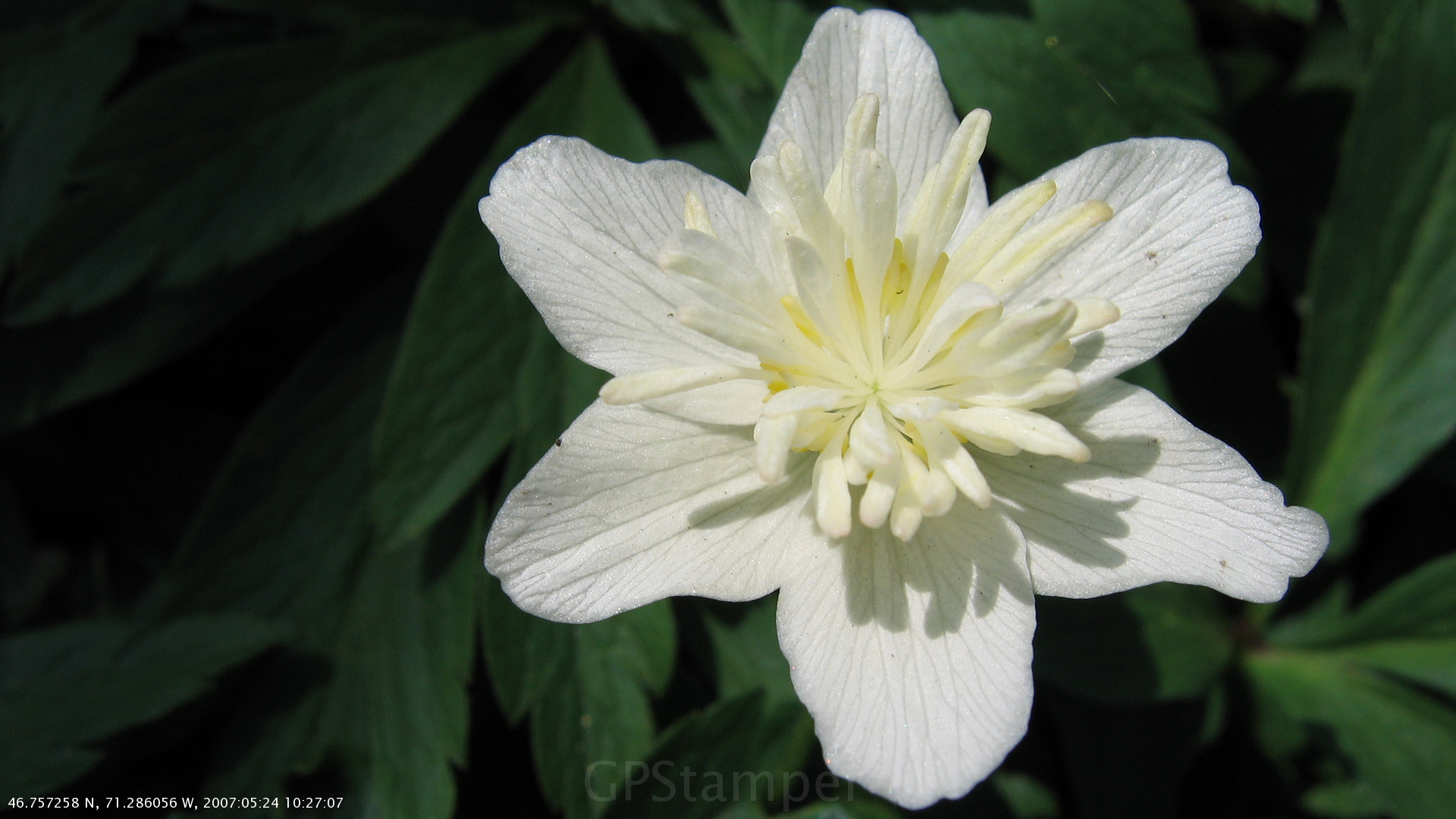
Geotag information stamped onto a JPEG photo by the software GPStamper

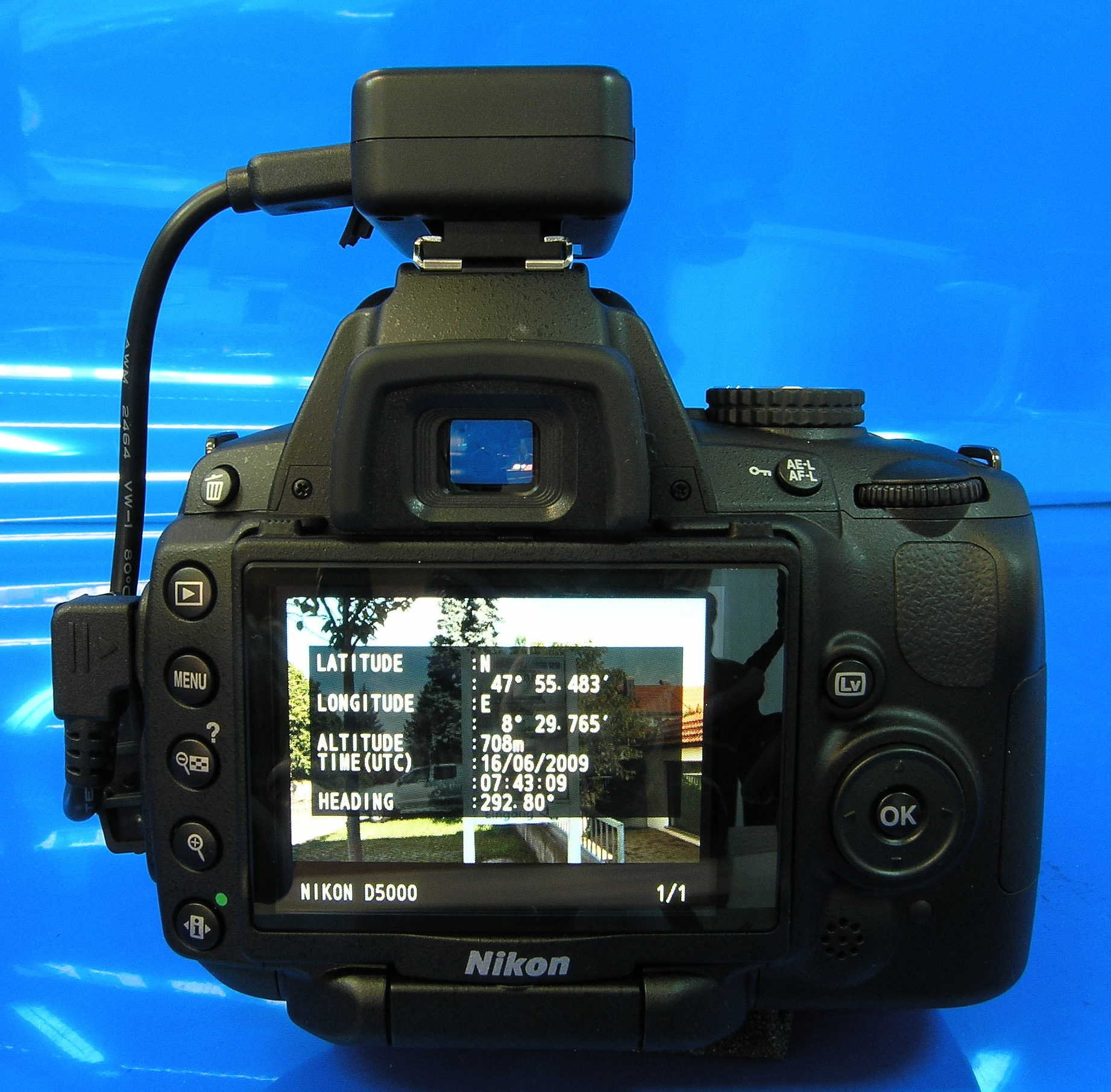
Geotagger "Solmeta N2" for the Nikon D5000 DSLR

Geotagging, or GeoTagging, is the process of adding geographical identification metadata to various media such as a geotagged photograph or video, websites, SMS messages, QR Codes or RgSSfeeds and is a form of geospatial metadata. This data usually consists of latitude and longitude coordinates, though they can also include altitude, bearing, distance, accuracy data, and place names, and perhaps a time stamp.

Geotagging can help users find a wide variety of location-specific information from a device. For instance, someone can find images taken near a given location by entering latitude and longitude coordinates into a suitable image search engine. Geotagging-enabled information services can also potentially be used to find location-based news, websites, or other resources. Geotagging can tell users the location of the content of a given picture or other media or the point of view, and conversely on some media platforms show media relevant to a given location.

The geographical location data used in geotagging can, in almost every case, be derived from the global positioning system, and based on a latitude/longitude-coordinate system that presents each location on the earth from 180° west through 180° east along the Equator and 90° north through 90° south along the prime meridian.

The related term geocoding refers to the process of taking non-coordinate-based geographical identifiers, such as a street address, and finding associated geographic coordinates (or vice versa for reverse geocoding). Such techniques can be used together with geotagging to provide alternative search techniques.

== Applications ==
=== In social media ===
Geotagging is a popular feature on several social media platforms, such as Facebook and Instagram.

Facebook users can geotag photos that can be added to the page of the location they are tagging. Users may also use a feature that allows them to find nearby Facebook friends by generating a list of people according to the location tracker in their mobile devices.

Instagram uses a map feature that allows users to geotag photos. The map layout pin points specific photos that the user has taken on a world map.

=== Photos ===
Two main options can be used to geotag photos: capturing GPS information at the time the photo is taken or "attaching" geocoordinates to the photograph after the picture is taken.

In order to capture GPS data at the time the photograph is captured, the user must have a camera with built in GPS or a standalone GPS along with a digital camera. Because of the requirement for wireless service providers in United States to supply more precise location information for 911 calls by September 11, 2012, more and more cell phones have built-in GPS chips. Most smart phones already use a GPS chip along with built-in cameras to allow users to automatically geotag photos. Others may have the GPS chip and camera but do not have internal software needed to embed the GPS information within the picture. A few digital cameras also have built-on or built-in GPS that allow for automatic geotagging.

Devices use GPS, A-GPS or both. A-GPS can be faster getting an initial fix if within range of a cell phone tower, and may work better inside buildings. Traditional GPS does not need cell phone towers and uses standard GPS signals outside of urban areas. Traditional GPS tends to use more battery power. Almost any digital camera can be coupled with a stand-alone GPS and post processed with photo mapping software, to write the location information to the image's exif header.

=== Remote sensing data ===
In the field of remote sensing the geotagging goal is to store coordinates of every pixel in the image. One approach is used with the orthophotos where we store coordinates of four corners and all the other pixels can be georeferenced by interpolation. The four corners are stored using GeoTIFF or World file standards. Hyperspectral images take a different approach defining a separate file of the same spatial dimensions as the image where latitude and longitude of each pixel are stored as two 2D layers in so called Input geometry data (IGM) files, also known as GEO files.

=== Audio/video files ===
Audio/video files can be geotagged via: metadata, audio encoding, overlay, or with companion files. Metadata records the geospatial data in the encoded video file to be decoded for later analysis. One of the standards used with unmanned aerial vehicle is MISB Standard 0601 which allows geocoding of corner points and horizon lines in individual video frames. Audio encoding involves a process of converting gps data into audio data such as modem squawk. Overlay involves overlaying GPS data as text on the recorded video. Companion files are separate data files which correspond to respective audio/video files. Companion files are typically found in the .KML and .GPX data formats. For audio and video files which use the vorbiscomment metadata format (including Opus, Ogg Vorbis, FLAC, Speex, and Ogg Theora), there is a proposed GEO LOCATION field which can be used. Like all vorbis comments, it is plain text, and it takes the form:

GEO_LOCATION=(decimal latitude);(decimal longitude);([optional]elevation in meters)

for example:

GEO_LOCATION=35.1592;-98.4422;410

=== SMS messages ===
The GeoSMS standard works by embedding one or more 'geo' URIs in the body of an SMS, for example:

I'm at the pub geo:-37.801631,144.980294;u=16

=== DNS entries ===
RFC 1876 defines a means for expressing location information in the Domain Name System. LOC resources records can specify the latitude, longitude, altitude, precision of the location, and the physical size of on entity attached to an IP address. However, in practice not all IP addresses have such a record, so it is more common to use geolocation services to find the physical location of an IP address.

=== HTML pages ===
==== ICBM method ====
The GeoURL method requires the ICBM tag (plus optional Dublin Core metadata), which is used to geotag standard web pages in HTML format:

 <meta name="ICBM" content="50.167958, -97.133185">

The similar Geotag format allows the addition of place name and region tags:

 <meta name="geo.position" content="50.167958;-97.133185">
 <meta name="geo.placename" content="Rockwood Rural Municipality, Manitoba, Canada">
 <meta name="geo.region" content="ca-mb">

==== RDF feeds ====
The RDF method is defined by W3 Group and presents the information in RDF tags:

<rdf:RDF xmlns:rdf="http://www.w3.org/1999/02/22-rdf-syntax-ns#"
         xmlns:geo="http://www.w3.org/2003/01/geo/wgs84_pos#">
  <geo:Point>
  <geo:lat>55.701</geo:lat>
  <geo:long>12.552</geo:long>
  </geo:Point>
</rdf:RDF>

==== Microformat ====
The Geo microformat allows coordinates within HyperText Markup Language pages to be marked up in such a way that they can be "discovered" by software tools. Example:

 <span class="geo">
    <span class="latitude">50.167958</span>;
    <span class="longitude">-97.133185</span>
 </span>

A proposal has been developed to extend Geo to cover other bodies, such as Mars and the Moon.

An example is the Flickr photo-sharing Web site, which provides geographic data for any geotagged photo in all of the above-mentioned formats.

=== In tag-based systems ===
No industry standards exist, however there are a variety of techniques for adding geographical identification metadata to an information resource. One convention, established by the website Geobloggers and used by more and more sites, e.g. photo sharing sites Panoramio and Flickr, and the social bookmarking site del.icio.us, enables content to be found via a location search. Such sites allow users to add metadata to an information resource via a set of so-called machine tags (see folksonomy).

geotagged
geo:lat=57.64911
geo:lon=10.40744

This describes the geographic coordinates of a particular location in terms of latitude (geo:lat) and longitude (geo:lon). These are expressed in decimal degrees in the WGS84 datum, which has become something of a default geodetic datum with the advent of GPS.

Using three tags works within the constraint of having tags that can only be single 'words'. Identifying geotagged information resources on sites like Flickr and del.icio.us is done by searching for the 'geotagged' tag, since the tags beginning geo:lat= and geo:lon= are necessarily very variable.

Another option is to tag with a Geohash:

geo:hash=u4pruydqqvj

A further convention proposed by FlickrFly adds tags to specify the suggested viewing angle and range when the geotagged location is viewed in Google Earth:

ge:head=225.00
ge:tilt=45.00
ge:range=560.00

These three tags would indicate that the camera is pointed heading 225° (south west), has a 45° tilt and is 560 metres from the subject.

Where the above methods are in use, their coordinates may differ from those specified by the photo's internal Exif data, for example because of a correction or a difference between the camera's location and the subject's.

In order to integrate geotags in social media and enhance text readability or oral use, the concept of 'meetag' or tag-to-meet has been proposed. Differing from hashtag construction, meetag includes the geolocation information after an underscore. A meetag is therefore a word or an unspaced phrase prefixed with an underscore ("_"). Words in messages on microblogging and social networking services may be tagged by putting "_" before them, either as they appear in a sentence, (e.g. "There is a concert going _montreuxjazzfestival", "the world wide web was invented _cern _geneve", ...) or appended to it.

=== Geoblogging ===
Geoblogging attaches specific geographic location information to blog entries via geotags. Searching a list of blogs and pictures tagged using geotag technology allows users to select areas of specific interest to them on interactive maps.

The progression of GPS technology, along with the development of various online applications, has fueled the popularity of such tagged blogging, and the combination of GPS phones and GSM localization, has led to the moblogging, where blog posts are tagged with exact position of the user. Real-time geotagging relays automatically geotagged media such as photos or video to be published and shared immediately.

For better integration and readability of geotags into blog texts, the meetag syntax has been proposed, which transforms any word, sentence, or precise geolocalization coordinates prefixed with an underscore into a 'meetag'. It not only lets one express a precise location but also takes in account dynamically changing geolocations.

=== Wikipedia article geosearching apps ===
One of the first attempts to initiate the geotagging aspect of searching and locating articles seems to be the now-inoperative site Wikinear.com, launched in 2008, which showed the user Wikipedia pages that are geographically closest to one's current location.

The 2009 app Cyclopedia works relatively well showing geotagged Wikipedia articles located within several miles of ones location, integrated with a street-view mode, and 360-degree mode.

The app Respotter Wiki, launched in 2009, claims to feature Wikipedia searching via a map, also allowing users to interact with people around them, via messaging and reviews, etc. The app, in its current function, however, seems to give only geotagged photo results.

As of 2017, the Wikipedia-World Project provides a simple map search tool which can display tagged articles near to a particular location, as well as a variety of more sophisticated tools integrated with external mapping services.

== Dangers ==
Following a scientific study and several demonstrative websites, a discussion on the privacy implications of geotagging has raised public attention. In particular, the automatic embedding of geotags in pictures taken with smartphones is often ignored by cell-phone users. As a result, people are often not aware that the photos they publish on the Internet have been geotagged. Many celebrities reportedly gave away their home location without knowing it. According to the study, a significant number of for-sale advertisements on Craigslist, that were otherwise anonymized, contained geotags, thereby revealing the location of high-valued goods—sometimes in combination with clear hints to the absence of the offerer at certain times. Publishing photos and other media tagged with exact geolocation on the Internet allows random people to track an individual's location and correlate it with other information. Therefore, criminals could find out when homes are empty because their inhabitants posted geotagged and timestamped information both about their home address and their vacation residence. These dangers can be avoided by removing geotags with a metadata removal tool for photos before publishing them on the Internet.

In 2007, four United States Army Apache helicopters were destroyed on the ground by Iraqi insurgent mortar fire; the insurgents had made use of embedded coordinates in web-published photographs (geotagging) taken of the helicopters by soldiers.

Another newly realized danger of geotagging is the location information provided to criminal gangs and poachers on the whereabouts of often endangered animals. This can effectively make tourists scouts for these poachers, so geotagging should be turned off when photographing these animals. According to Chinoitezvi Honour, some phones automatically geotag pictures hence location should be turned off when taking pictures.

== See also ==
- Geocaching
- Geographic information system (GIS)
- Georeferencing
- Geomessaging
- GeoRSS
- geo URI scheme
- ISO 6709, standard representation of geographic point location by coordinates
- Tag (metadata)
- Toponym resolution
