= LOC record =

DNS resource record holding location data

In the Domain Name System, a LOC record (experimental RFC 1876) is a means for expressing geographic location information for a domain name.

It contains WGS84 Latitude, Longitude and Altitude (ellipsoidal height) information together with host/subnet physical size and location accuracy. This information can be queried by other computers connected to the Internet.

== Record format ==
The LOC record is expressed in a master file in the following format:

⟨owner⟩ ⟨TTL⟩ ⟨class⟩ LOC ( d1 [m1 [s1]] {"N"|"S"} d2 [m2 [s2]]
                           {"E"|"W"} alt["m"] [siz["m"] [hp["m"]
                           [vp["m"]]]] )

(The parentheses are used for multi-line data as specified in RFC 1035, section 5.1.)

where:

    d1:     [0 .. 90]            (degrees latitude)
    d2:     [0 .. 180]           (degrees longitude)
    m1, m2: [0 .. 59]            (minutes latitude/longitude)
    s1, s2: [0 .. 59.999]        (seconds latitude/longitude)
    alt:    [-100000.00 .. 42849672.95] BY .01 (altitude in meters)
    siz, hp, vp: [0 .. 90000000.00] (size/precision in meters)

== An example DNS LOC resource record ==
- statdns.net for the coordinates: 52°22′23″N 4°53′32″E

statdns.net.   IN LOC   52 22 23.000 N 4 53 32.000 E -2.00m 0.00m 10000m 10m

== Altitude for Geosynchronous Earth Satellites ==
The altitude range provides the following:

- DNS altitude range [-100000.00 .. 42849672.95]. This range can be easily stored in 4 bytes.
- Maximum altitude is 42,849.67295 km. Which is large enough to store the altitude of a circular geosynchronous orbit (i.e. approximately 35,790 km above mean sea level).
- Maximum depth of 100 km below earth surface (approximated by the WGS84 reference ellipsoid).

== See also ==
- List of DNS record types
- Geo (microformat)
- Geolocation
- Geolocation API
- ICBM address
- ISO 6709
