= GeoSMS =

GeoSMS is a specification for geotagging SMS messages. It works by embedding locations in the message text, where the locations are formatted as 'geo' URIs as defined in RFC 5870.

It was developed in 2010 by Matthew Kwan, a PhD Candidate at the RMIT School of Mathematical and Geospatial Sciences and should not be confused with the Open GeoSMS standard.

== Examples ==
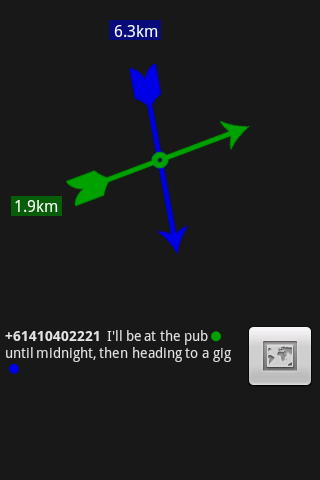
A geotagged SMS as displayed by the I Am Here application.

A simple geotagged SMS might look like:

I'm at the pub geo:-37.801631,144.980294;u=10

which would contain the message I'm at the pub and a location with latitude 37.801631 degrees south, longitude 144.980294 degrees east, and an uncertainty of (+ or -) 10 metres.

Messages using GeoSMS can also contain multiple locations, for example:

I'll be at the pub geo:-37.801631,144.980294;u=10 until midnight, then heading to a gig geo:-37.864225,144.97294

which contains two locations.

== Applications ==
GeoSMS is used by the free Android application I Am Here (available through the Google Play) to send and receive geotagged SMS messages. It displays received messages using either a compass or map view. The GeoSMS specification is also being used to allow ships and cruising vessels to send position updates from an SMS-capable satellite phone, such as one of the recent models marketed by Iridium Communications or Globalstar.

== Open GeoSMS ==
The Open Geospatial Consortium also has an approved Open GeoSMS standard, published in 2011. This standard has been broadly implemented in Asia. The OGC Open GeoSMS standard was originally developed in Taiwan by ITRI in 2008 and submitted into the OGC in 2009.

== See also ==
- Geotagging
- Geo URI scheme
