= Thaddeus Vincenty =

Polish-American geodesist (1920 - 2002)

- Born: Tadeusz Szpila; 27 October 1920; Grodzisko, Lwów Voivodship, Poland
- Died: 6 March 2002 (aged 81); Washington Grove, Maryland, USA
- Resting place: Parklawn Memorial Park
- Citizenship: American
- Known for: Vincenty's formulae
- Scientific career
- Fields: Geodesy
- Workplaces: United States Air Force; U.S. National Geodetic Survey

Thaddeus Vincenty (born Tadeusz Szpila; 27 October 1920 – 6 March 2002) was a Polish American geodesist who worked with the U.S. Air Force and later the National Geodetic Survey to adapt three-dimensional adjustment techniques to NAD 83. He devised Vincenty's formulae, a geodesic calculation technique published in 1975 which is accurate to about half a millimeter.

Vincenty's studies were interrupted by World War II, and he eventually arrived in a displaced persons camp. He arrived in the United States in 1947, and took his father's first name as his surname. Within months, he enlisted in the Air Force, and only became involved in computer programming and surveying in 1957. After studying via correspondence courses, he published his first research paper in 1963. After 30 years in the Air Force, he left Cheyenne, Wyoming, and took a position at National Geodetic Survey.

His contributions to the NAD 83 include the introduction of three dimensional Earth-centered coordinates, which unifies locations on Earth with locations in space, an essential development for the Global Positioning System.

Vincenty received the Department of Commerce Medal for Meritorious Service in 1982. He and his wife Barbara had one daughter, two sons, and three grandchildren at the time of his death.

== See also ==
- Geodesy
- Geodesic
- Earth radius
- Vincenty's formulae
