= Horizontal position representation =

A position representation is a set of parameters used to express a position relative to a reference frame. When representing positions relative to the Earth, it is often most convenient to represent vertical position (height or depth) separately, and to use some other parameters to represent horizontal position. There are also several applications where only the horizontal position is of interest, this might e.g. be the case for ships and ground vehicles/cars. It is a type of geographic coordinate system.

There are several options for horizontal position representations, each with different properties which makes them appropriate for different applications. Latitude/longitude and UTM are common horizontal position representations.

The horizontal position has two degrees of freedom, and thus two parameters are sufficient to uniquely describe such a position. However, similarly to the use of Euler angles as a formalism for representing rotations, using only the minimum number of parameters gives singularities, and thus three parameters are required for the horizontal position to avoid this.

== Latitude and longitude ==
The most common horizontal position representation is latitude and longitude. The parameters are intuitive and well known, and are thus suited for communicating a position to humans, e.g. using a position plot.

However, latitude and longitude should be used with care in mathematical expressions (including calculations in computer programs). The main reason is the singularities at the Poles, which makes longitude undefined at these points. Also near the poles the latitude/longitude grid is highly non-linear, and several errors may occur in calculations that are sufficiently accurate on other locations.

Another problematic area is the meridian at ±180° longitude, where the longitude has a discontinuity, and hence specific program code must often be written to handle this. An example of the consequences of omitting such code is the crash of the navigation systems of twelve F-22 Raptor fighter aircraft while crossing this meridian.

== n-vector ==
n-vector is a three parameter non-singular horizontal position representation that can replace latitude and longitude. Geometrically, it is a unit vector which is normal to the reference ellipsoid. The vector is decomposed in an Earth centered earth fixed coordinate system. It behaves the same at all Earth positions, and it holds the mathematical one-to-one property. The vector formulation makes it possible to use standard 3D vector algebra, and thus n-vector is well-suited for mathematical calculations, e.g. adding, subtracting, interpolating and averaging positions.

Using three parameters, n-vector is inconvenient for communicating a position directly to humans and before showing a position plot, a conversion to latitude/longitude might be needed.

== Local flat Earth approximation ==
When carrying out several calculations within a limited area, a Cartesian coordinate system might be defined with the origin at a specified Earth-fixed position. The origin is often selected at the surface of the reference ellipsoid, with the z-axis in the vertical direction. Hence (three dimensional) position vectors relative to this coordinate frame will have two horizontal and one vertical parameter. The axes are typically selected as North-East-Down or East-North-Up, and thus this system can be viewed as a linearization of the meridians and parallels.

For small areas a local coordinate system can be convenient for relative positioning, but with increasing (horizontal) distances, errors will increase and repositioning of the tangent point may be required. The alignment along the north and east directions is not possible at the Poles, and near the Poles these directions might have significant errors (here the linearization is valid only in a very small area).

== Grid reference system ==
Instead of one local Cartesian grid, that needs to be repositioned as the position of interest moves, a fixed set of map projections covering the Earth can be defined.

=== UTM ===
UTM is one such system, dividing the Earth into 60 longitude zones (and with UPS covering the Polar regions).

UTM is widely used, and the coordinates approximately corresponds to meters north and east. However, as a set of map-projections it has inherent distortions, and thus most calculations based on UTM will not be exact. The crossing of zones gives additional complexity.

== Comparison ==
When deciding which parameters to use for representing position in a specific application, there are several properties that should be considered. The following table gives a summary of what to consider.

Comparison of horizontal position representations
Representation	Pros	Cons
Latitude and longitude	Widely used; Parameters are easy to recognize by humans (well-suited for plotting)	Singularities at the Poles; Complex behavior near the Poles; Discontinuity at the ±180° meridian
n-vector	Nonsingular; Efficient in equations/calculations since standard 3D vector algebra can be used; All Earth positions are treated equally	Inconvenient for communicating a position to humans; Uses three parameters
Local Cartesian coordinate system	Cartesian vectors in meters along the directions of north, east and down are obtained	Can only be used for relative positioning (the tangent point must be represented by some other quantity); Errors increase with increasing horizontal distance from the tangent point (which may require repositioning of the tangent point); North and east directions are undefined at the Poles, and near the Poles these directions may change significantly within the area of interest
UTM	Widely used; Approximate north and east directions; One unit corresponds approximately to one meter	Inherent distortion (due to the map projection) gives only approximate answers for most calculations; Calculations get complex when crossing the zones; The Polar Regions are not covered

== See also ==
- Rotation formalisms in three dimensions
- Geodetic coordinates
- Geodetic system
- Plane coordinates
