= Longitude =

East-West geographic coordinate

Earth with blue longitude lines and corresponding degrees.

A graticule on the Earth as a sphere or an ellipsoid. The lines from pole to pole are lines of constant longitude, or meridians. The circles parallel to the Equator are circles of constant latitude, or parallels. The graticule shows the latitude and longitude of points on the surface. In this example, meridians are spaced at 6° intervals and parallels at 4° intervals.

Longitude (/ˈlɒndʒɪtjuːd/, AU and UK also /ˈlɒŋɡɪ-/) is a geographic coordinate that specifies the east-west position of a point on the surface of the Earth, or another celestial body. It is an angular measurement, usually expressed in degrees and denoted by the Greek letter lambda (λ). Meridians are imaginary semicircular lines running from pole to pole that connect points with the same longitude. The prime meridian defines 0° longitude; by convention the International Reference Meridian for the Earth passes near the Royal Observatory in Greenwich, south-east London on the island of Great Britain. Positive longitudes are east of the prime meridian, and negative ones are west.

Because of the Earth's rotation, there is a close connection between longitude and time measurement. Scientifically precise local time varies with longitude: a difference of 15° longitude corresponds to a one-hour difference in local time, due to the differing position in relation to the Sun. Comparing local time to an absolute measure of time allows longitude to be determined. Depending on the era, the absolute time might be obtained from a celestial event visible from both locations, such as a lunar eclipse, or from a time signal transmitted by telegraph or radio. The principle is straightforward, but in practice finding a reliable method of determining longitude took centuries and required the effort of some of the greatest scientific minds.

A location's north-south position along a meridian is given by its latitude, which is approximately the angle between the equatorial plane and the normal from the ground at that location.

Longitude is generally given using the geodetic normal or the gravity direction. The astronomical longitude can differ slightly from the ordinary longitude because of vertical deflection, small variations in Earth's gravitational field (see astronomical latitude).

== History ==
The concept of longitude was first developed by ancient Greek astronomers. Hipparchus (2nd century BC) used a coordinate system that assumed a spherical Earth, and divided it into 360° as is still done today. His prime meridian passed through Alexandria. He also proposed a method of determining longitude by comparing the local time of a lunar eclipse at two different places, thus demonstrating an understanding of the relationship between longitude and time. Claudius Ptolemy (2nd century AD) developed a mapping system using curved parallels that reduced distortion. He also collected data for many locations, from Britain to the Middle East. He used a prime meridian through the Canary Islands, so that all longitude values would be positive. While Ptolemy's system was sound, the data he used were often poor, leading to a gross over-estimate (by about 70%) of the length of the Mediterranean.

After the fall of the Roman Empire, interest in geography greatly declined in Europe. Hindu and Muslim astronomers continued to develop these ideas, adding many new locations and often improving on Ptolemy's data. For example, al-Battānī used simultaneous observations of two lunar eclipses to determine the difference in longitude between Antakya and Raqqa with an error of less than 1°. This is considered to be the best that can be achieved with the methods then available: observation of the eclipse with the naked eye, and determination of local time using an astrolabe to measure the altitude of a suitable "clock star".

In the later Middle Ages, interest in geography revived in the west, as travel increased, and Arab scholarship began to be known through contact with Spain and North Africa. In the 12th century, astronomical tables were prepared for a number of European cities, based on the work of al-Zarqālī in Toledo. The lunar eclipse of September 12, 1178 was used to establish the longitude differences between Toledo, Marseilles, and Hereford.

Christopher Columbus made two attempts to use lunar eclipses to discover his longitude, the first in Saona Island, on 14 September 1494 (second voyage), and the second in Jamaica on 29 February 1504 (fourth voyage). It is assumed that he used astronomical tables for reference. His determinations of longitude showed large errors of 13° and 38° W respectively. Randles (1985) documents longitude measurement by the Portuguese and Spanish between 1514 and 1627 both in the Americas and Asia. Errors ranged from 2° to 25°.

The telescope was invented in the early 17th century. Initially an observation device, developments over the next half century transformed it into an accurate measurement tool. The pendulum clock was patented by Christiaan Huygens in 1657 and gave an increase in accuracy of about 30 fold over previous mechanical clocks. These two inventions would revolutionise observational astronomy and cartography.

On land, the period from the development of telescopes and pendulum clocks until the mid-18th century saw a steady increase in the number of places whose longitude had been determined with reasonable accuracy, often with errors of less than a degree, and nearly always within 2° to 3°. By the 1720s errors were consistently less than 1°. At sea during the same period, the situation was very different. Two problems proved intractable; the first was the need of a navigator for immediate results, and the second was the marine environment. Making accurate observations in an ocean swell is much harder than on land, and pendulum clocks do not work well in these conditions.

=== The Chronometer ===
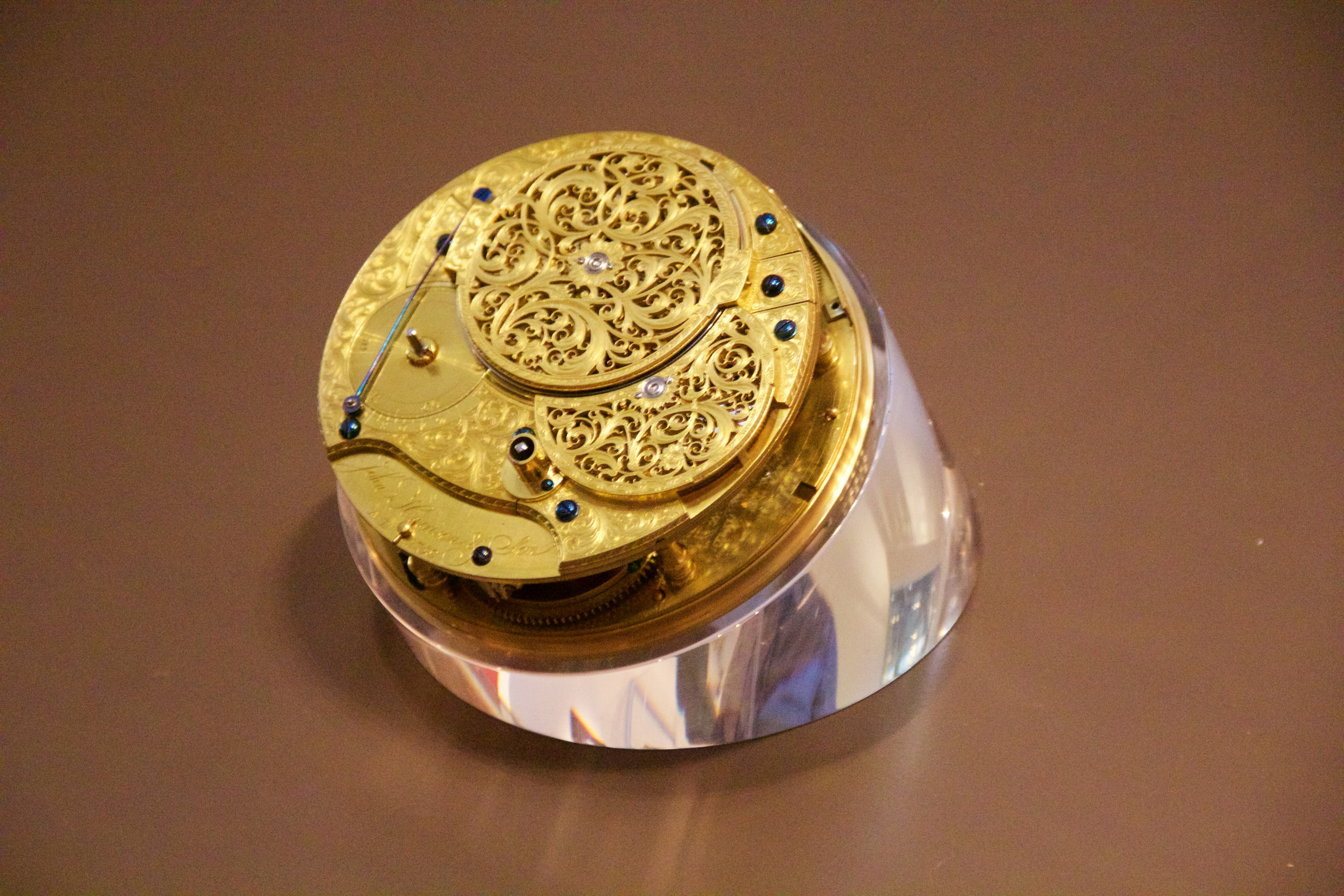
The clockwork in John Harrison's H4 marine chronometer on display at the Royal Observatory, Greenwich

In response to the problems of navigation, a number of European maritime powers offered prizes for a method to determine longitude at sea. The best-known of these is the Longitude Act passed by the British parliament in 1714. It offered two levels of rewards, for solutions within 1° and 0.5°. Rewards were given for two solutions: lunar distances, made practicable by the tables of Tobias Mayer developed into a nautical almanac by the Astronomer Royal Nevil Maskelyne; and for the chronometers developed by the Yorkshire carpenter and clock-maker John Harrison. Harrison built five chronometers over more than three decades. This work was supported and rewarded with thousands of pounds from the Board of Longitude, but he fought to receive money up to the top reward of £20,000, finally receiving an additional payment in 1773 after the intervention of Parliament. It was some while before either method became widely used in navigation. In the early years, chronometers were very expensive, and the calculations required for lunar distances were still complex and time-consuming. Lunar distances came into general use after 1790. Chronometers had the advantages that both the observations and the calculations were simpler, and as they became cheaper in the early 19th century they started to replace lunars, which were seldom used after 1850.

The first working telegraphs were established in Britain by Wheatstone and Cooke in 1839, and in the US by Morse in 1844. It was quickly realised that the telegraph could be used to transmit a time signal for longitude determination. The method was soon in practical use for longitude determination, especially in North America, and over longer and longer distances as the telegraph network expanded, including western Europe with the completion of transatlantic cables. The United States Coast Survey, renamed the United States Coast and Geodetic Survey in 1878, was particularly active in this development, and not just in the United States. The Survey established chains of mapped locations through Central and South America, and the West Indies, and as far as Japan and China in the years 1874–90. This contributed greatly to the accurate mapping of these areas.

While mariners benefited from the accurate charts, they could not receive telegraph signals while under way, and so could not use the method for navigation. This changed when wireless telegraphy (radio) became available in the early 20th century. Wireless time signals for the use of ships were transmitted from Halifax, Nova Scotia, starting in 1907 and from the Eiffel Tower in Paris from 1910. These signals allowed navigators to check and adjust their chronometers frequently.

Radio navigation systems came into general use after World War II. The systems all depended on transmissions from fixed navigational beacons. A ship-board receiver calculated the vessel's position from these transmissions. They allowed accurate navigation when poor visibility prevented astronomical observations, and became the established method for commercial shipping until replaced by GPS in the early 1990s.

== Determination ==
The main conventional methods for determining longitude are listed below. With one exception (magnetic declination), they all depend on a common principle, which is to determine the time for an event or measurement and to compare it with the time at a different location. Longitude, being up to 180° east or west of a prime meridian, is mathematically related to time differences up to 12 hours by a factor of 15. Thus, a time differential (in hours) between two points is multiplied by 15 to obtain a longitudinal difference (in degrees).

Historically, times used for calculating longitude have included apparent solar time, local mean time, and ephemeris time, with mean time being the one most used for navigation of the sea. See also the equation of time for details on the differences.

- Lunar distances and Moon culminations. In its orbit around the Earth, the Moon moves relative to the stars at a rate of just over 0.5°/hour. The angle between the limb of the Moon and a suitable star, planet, or sun is measured with a sextant, and, after consulting ephemeris tables, a value for the mean time at a reference meridian, usually Greenwich, can be calculated. For a culmination, the observer simply records the time and compares it with the reference time in the ephemerides after correcting for refraction and other errors. This method was established by Nathaniel Pigott around 1786. The Nautical Almanac was published in the UK beginning in 1767 and the American Ephemeris and Nautical Almanac starting in 1852.
- Satellites of Jupiter. Galileo proposed that with sufficiently accurate knowledge of the orbits of the satellites, their positions could provide a measure of absolute time. The method requires a telescope, as the moons are not visible to the naked eye. Ephemeris tables are employed for comparison to a reference meridian.
- Appulses, occultations, transits, and eclipses. An appulse is the least apparent distance between two objects (the Moon, a star or a planet); an occultation occurs when a star or planet passes behind the Moon — essentially a type of eclipse. Lunar eclipses continued to be used. The times of these events are compared to those of a reference meridian. Major observatories used the transit circle or meridian circle to establish very accurate longitude values for their country, often establishing their own prime meridian at the longitude of the instrument.
- Transport of chronometers. A clock is set to the local time of a starting point whose longitude is known, and the longitude of any other place can be determined by comparing its local mean time with the clock time. While marine chronometers are relatively stable, they are also relatively large and expensive. Prior to the quartz crystal, chronometers were susceptible to time drift from temperature fluctuations and vibration.
- Signals. Rockets and lights were occasionally used in the 18th and 19th century, although the method is impractical except for short distances and demonstrations. It was a rudimentary form of synchronizing time and establishing longitude. However, signaling by "ball drop" was extensively used in the US Navy and Royal Navy in the 19th century. In each case, there were observatories near bodies of water that would drop a ball from a tower, alerting the ships of the correct time, and hence enabling them to maintain stable longitudinal position fixes while at sea.
- Telegraphic determination of longitude. First suggested by the American astronomer Sears Cook Walker, the United States Coast Survey began deploying it in 1849. Europe quickly followed. As the American West was settled, mapping and surveying was greatly improved by the use of the telegraph to determine time and longitude differences between stations. The laying of transatlantic telegraph cables also helped establish coordinated global mapping and navigation.
- Magnetic declination. A compass needle does not in general point true north. The variation from true north varies with location, and it was suggested that this could provide a basis for determination of longitude.

With the exception of magnetic declination, all proved practicable methods. Developments on land and sea, however, were very different.

Several newer methods for navigation, location finding, and the determination of longitude exist. Radio navigation, satellite navigation, and Inertial navigation systems, along with celestial navigation, are a few of the more prevalent ones.

== Values ==
Longitude is given as an angular measurement with 0° at the Prime Meridian, ranging from −180° westward to +180° eastward. The Greek letter λ (lambda) is used to denote the location of a place on Earth east or west of the Prime Meridian.

Each degree of longitude is sub-divided into 60 minutes, each of which is divided into 60 seconds. A longitude is thus specified in sexagesimal notation as, for example, 23° 27′ 30″ E. For higher precision, the seconds are specified with a decimal fraction. An alternative representation uses degrees and minutes, and parts of a minute are expressed in decimal notation, thus: 23° 27.5′ E. Degrees may also be expressed as a decimal fraction: 23.45833° E. For calculations, the angular measure may be converted to radians, so longitude may also be expressed in this manner as a signed fraction of π (pi), or an unsigned fraction of 2π.

For calculations, the west/east suffix is replaced by a negative sign in the Western Hemisphere. The international standard convention (ISO 6709)—that east is positive—is consistent with a right-handed Cartesian coordinate system, with the North Pole up. A specific longitude may then be combined with a specific latitude (positive in the Northern Hemisphere) to give a precise position on the Earth's surface. Confusingly, the convention of negative for east is also sometimes seen, most commonly in the United States; the Earth System Research Laboratories used it on an older version of one of their pages, in order "to make coordinate entry less awkward" for applications confined to the Western Hemisphere. They have since shifted to the standard approach.

The longitude is singular at the Poles and calculations that are sufficiently accurate for other positions may be inaccurate at or near the Poles. Also the discontinuity at the ±180° meridian must be handled with care in calculations. An example is a calculation of east displacement by subtracting two longitudes, which gives the wrong answer if the two positions are on either side of this meridian. To avoid these complexities, some applications use another horizontal position representation.

== Length of a parallel arc ==
The length of an arc of a circle of latitude between two longitudes $\Delta \lambda = \lambda_2 - \lambda_1$ (in radians) depends only on the radius perpendicular to the axis of rotation:
$$\Delta p= r_p \cdot \Delta \lambda$$

For a sphere of constant radius R, that perpendicular radius at latitude φ is:
$$r_p = R \cos\phi$$

When the Earth is modelled by an ellipsoid, this becomes:

$$r_p = N \cos \phi$$

where the transverse radius of curvature N is:

$$N =\frac{a}{\sqrt{1 - e^2 \sin^2 \phi}}$$

and e is the eccentricity of the ellipsoid, related to the major and minor axes (the equatorial and polar radii respectively) by $e^2=\frac{a^2-b^2}{a^2}$.

An alternative formula is
$$r_p = a \cos \beta \quad \mbox{where }\tan \beta = \frac{b}{a} \tan \phi$$

Here $\beta$ is the so-called parametric or reduced latitude.

=== Length of a degree of longitude ===
The length of a degree of longitude is obtained replacing $\Delta \lambda = 1^\circ = (\pi/180) \, \mathrm{rad}$ in the formula above.
$$\Delta_\mathrm{long}^1=\Delta p_{1^\circ}= r_p \cdot \pi/180$$

φ	Δ^{1}_{lat}	Δ^{1}_{long}
0°	110.574 km	111.320 km
15°	110.649 km	107.551 km
30°	110.852 km	96.486 km
45°	111.133 km	78.847 km
60°	111.412 km	55.800 km
75°	111.618 km	28.902 km
90°	111.694 km	0.000 km

Length of one degree (black), minute (blue) and second (red) of latitude and longitude in metric (upper half) and imperial units (lower half) at a given latitude (vertical axis) in WGS84. For example, the green arrows show that Donetsk (green circle) at 48°N has a Δ_{long} of 74.63 km/° (1.244 km/min, 20.73 m/sec etc) and a Δ_{lat} of 111.2 km/° (1.853 km/min, 30.89 m/sec etc).

As cos φ decreases from 1 at the equator to 0 at the poles, circles of latitude shrink from the equator to a point at the pole, and the length of a degree of longitude decreases likewise. This contrasts with the small (1%) increase in the length of a degree of latitude (north–south distance), equator to pole. The table shows both for the WGS84 ellipsoid with a = 6378137.0 m and b = 6356752.3142 m. The distance between two points 1 degree apart on the same circle of latitude, measured along that circle of latitude, is slightly more than the shortest (geodesic) distance between those points (unless on the equator, where these are equal); the difference is less than 0.6 m (2 ft).

A geographical mile is defined as the length of one minute of arc along the equator (one equatorial minute of longitude) therefore a degree of longitude along the equator is exactly 60 geographical miles or 111.3 kilometers, as there are 60 minutes in a degree. The length of 1 minute of longitude along the equator is 1 geographical mile or 1.855 km or 1.153 miles, while the length of 1 second of it is 0.016 geographical mile or 30.916 m or 101.43 feet.

== See also ==
- American Practical Navigator
- Cardinal direction
- Dead reckoning
- Ecliptic longitude
- Geodesy
- Geodetic system
- Geographic coordinate system
- Geographical distance
- Geotagging
- Great-circle distance
- History of longitude
- The Island of the Day Before
- Latitude
- Meridian arc
- Natural Area Code
- Navigation
- Orders of magnitude
- Planetary coordinate system#Longitude
- Right ascension on celestial sphere
- World Geodetic System
