= GTOPO30 =

Digital elevation model

GTOPO30 is a digital elevation model for the world, developed by United States Geological Survey (USGS). It has a 30-arc second resolution (approximately 1 km), and is split into 33 tiles stored in the USGS DEM file format.

According to DTED and USGS DEM the absolute vertical accuracy of GTOP30 varies from ±30 meters.

== Gallery ==
This map (with 72 tiles) is derived from GTOPO30 data that describes the elevation of Earth's terrain at intervals of 30 arcseconds (approximately 1 km). It uses hypsometric tints instead of contour lines to indicate elevation.

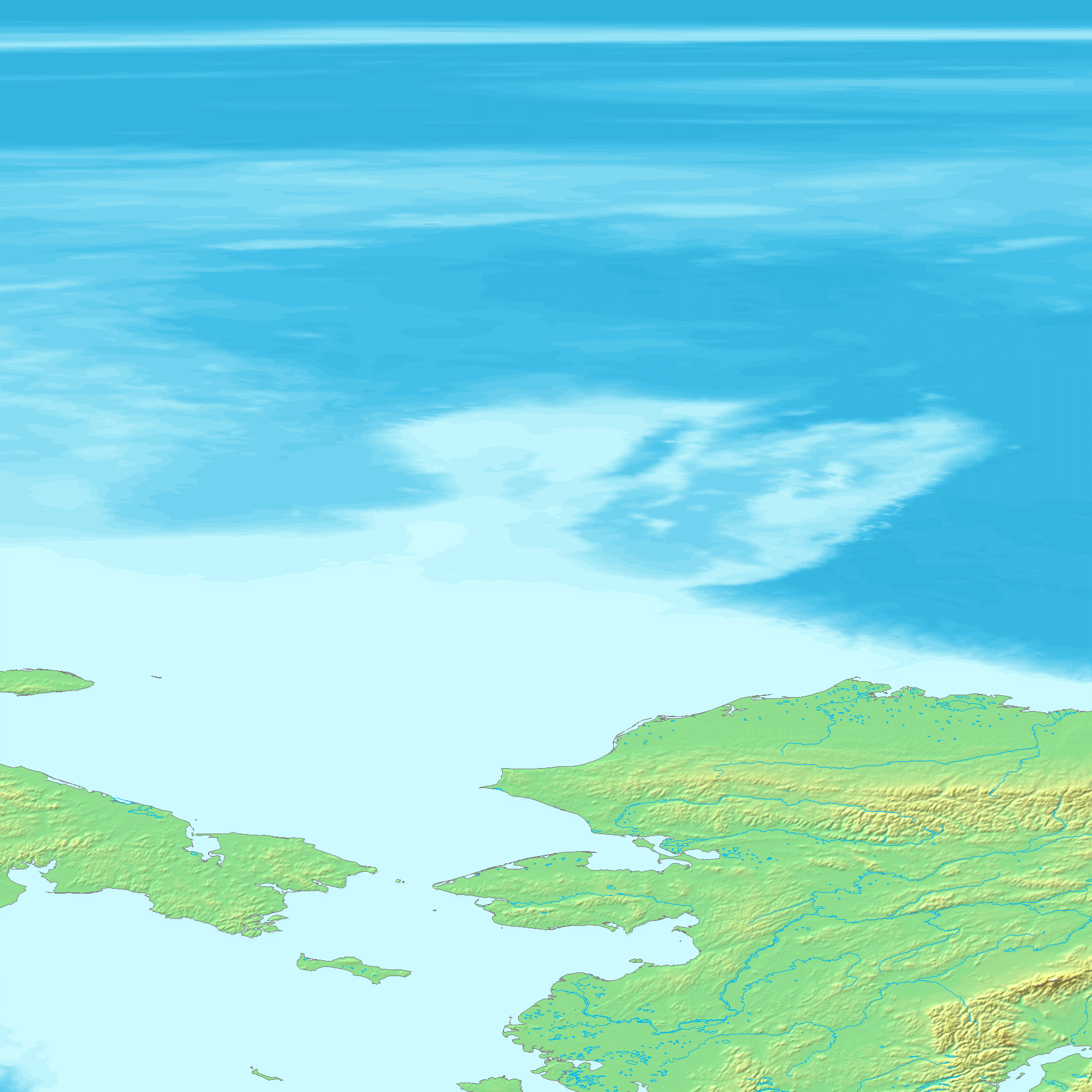

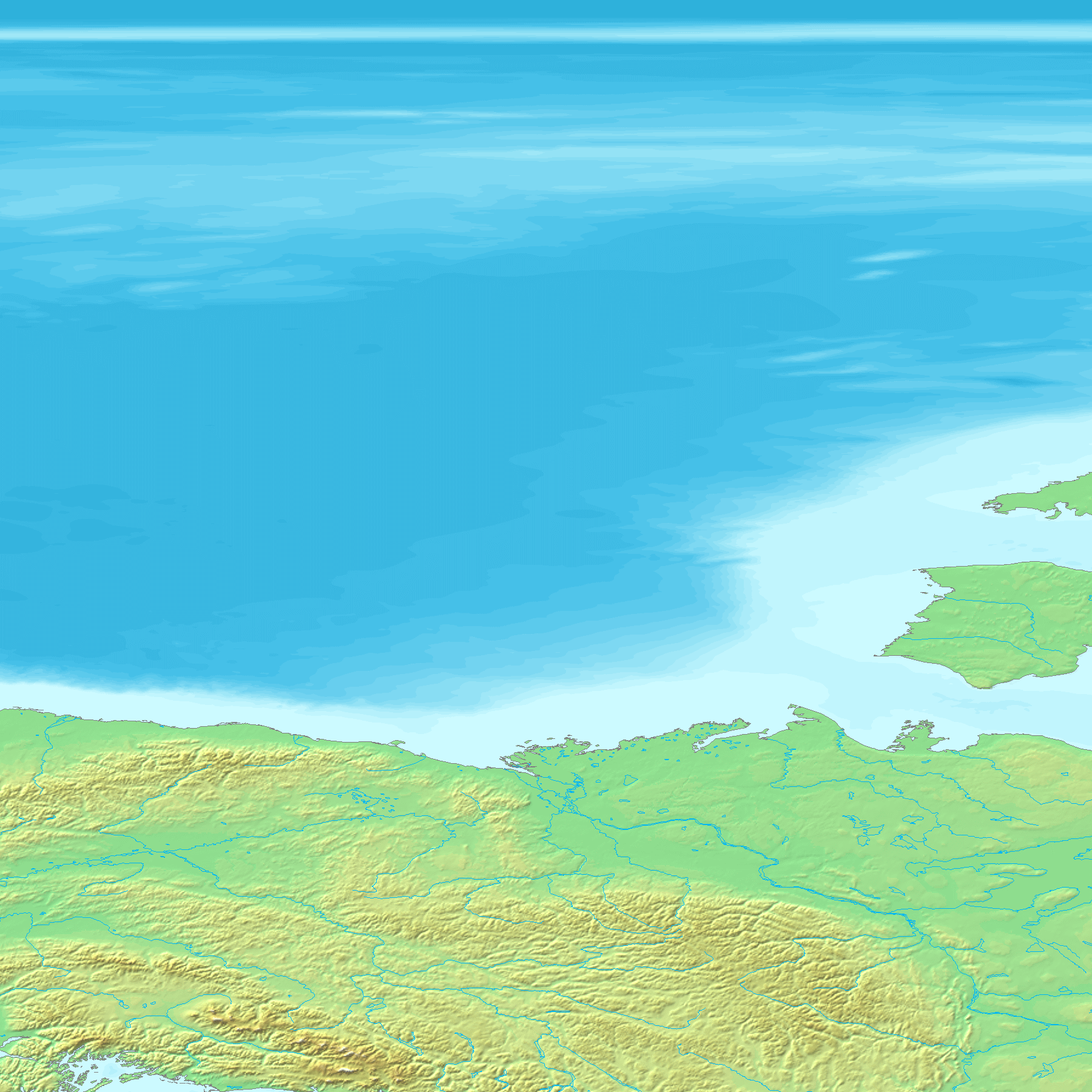

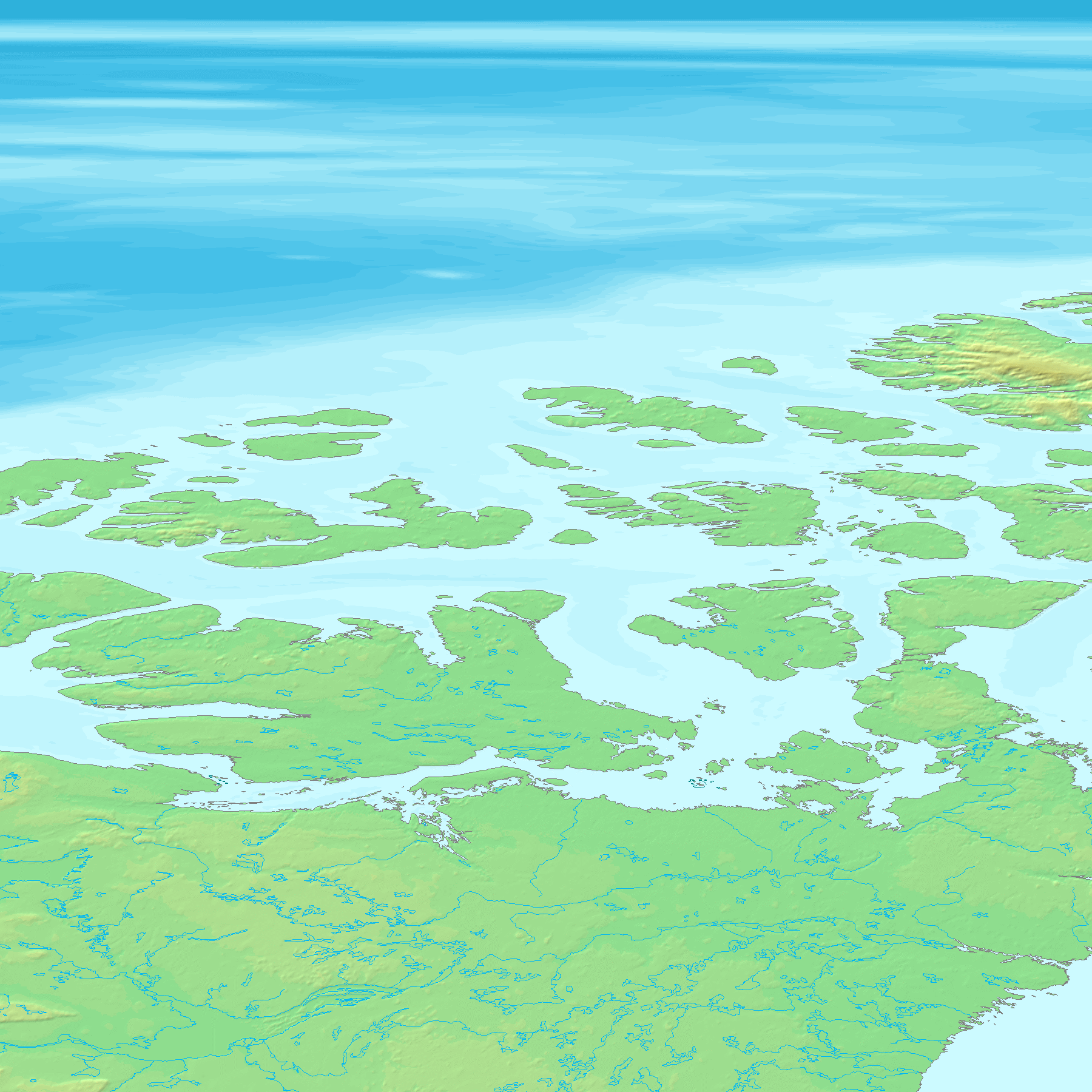

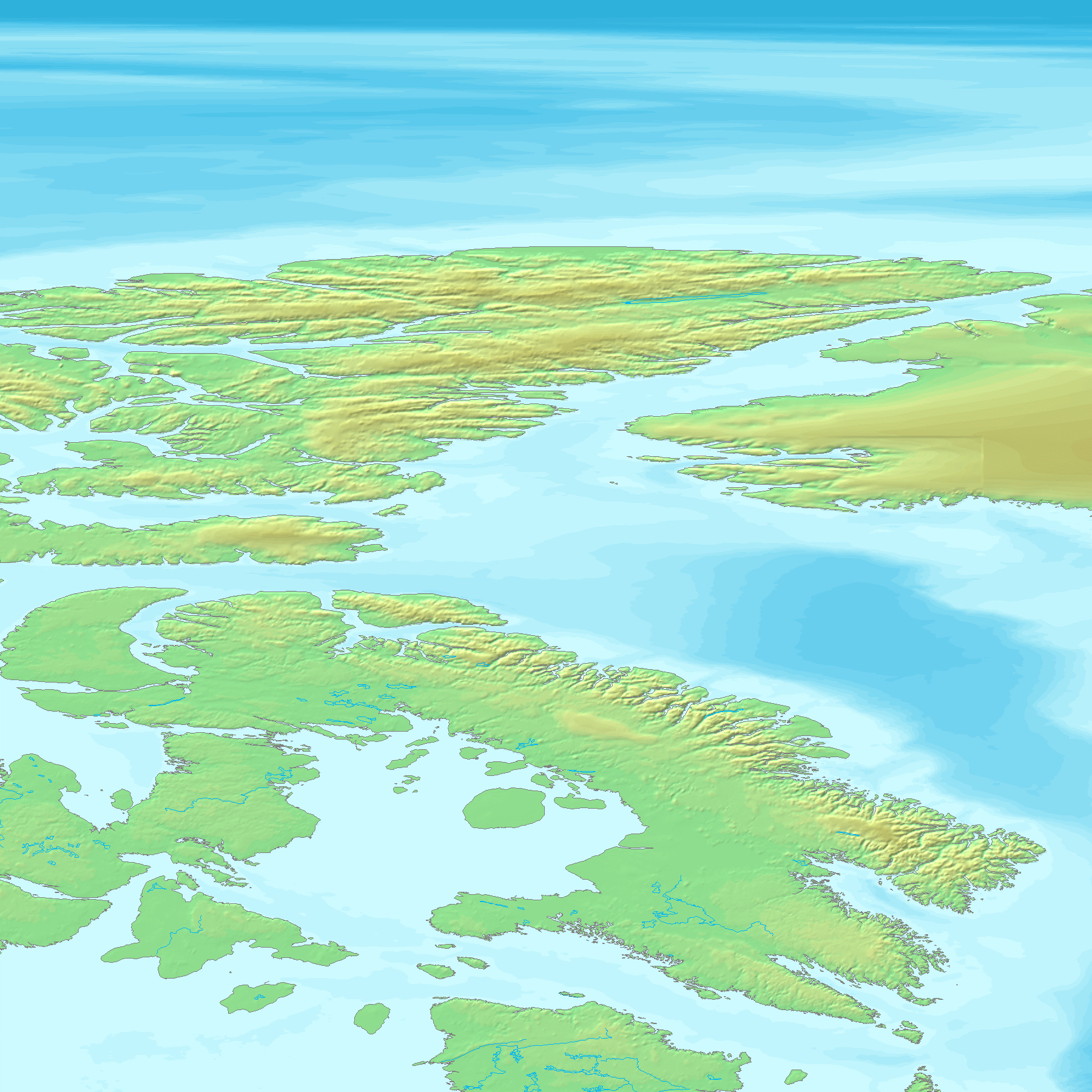

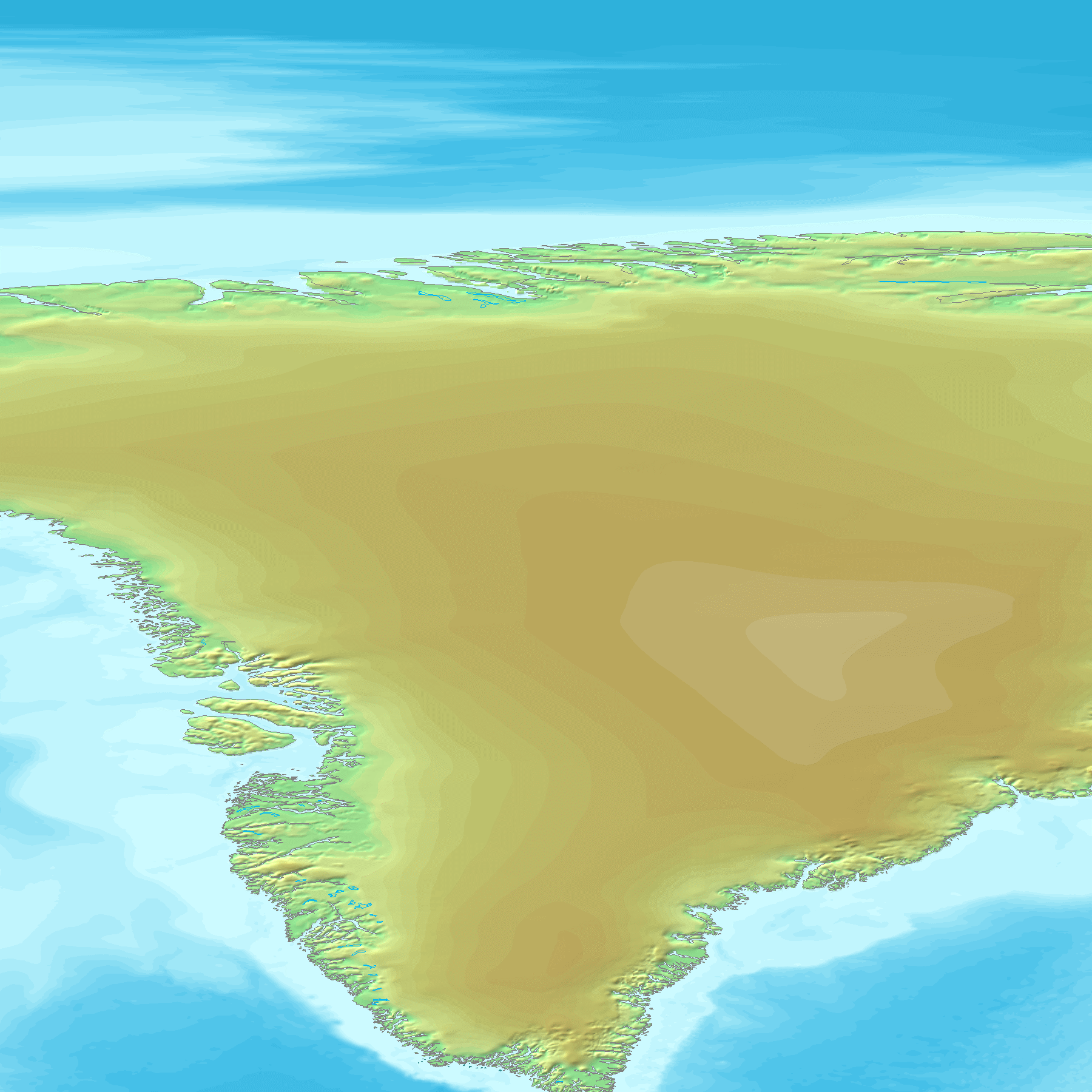

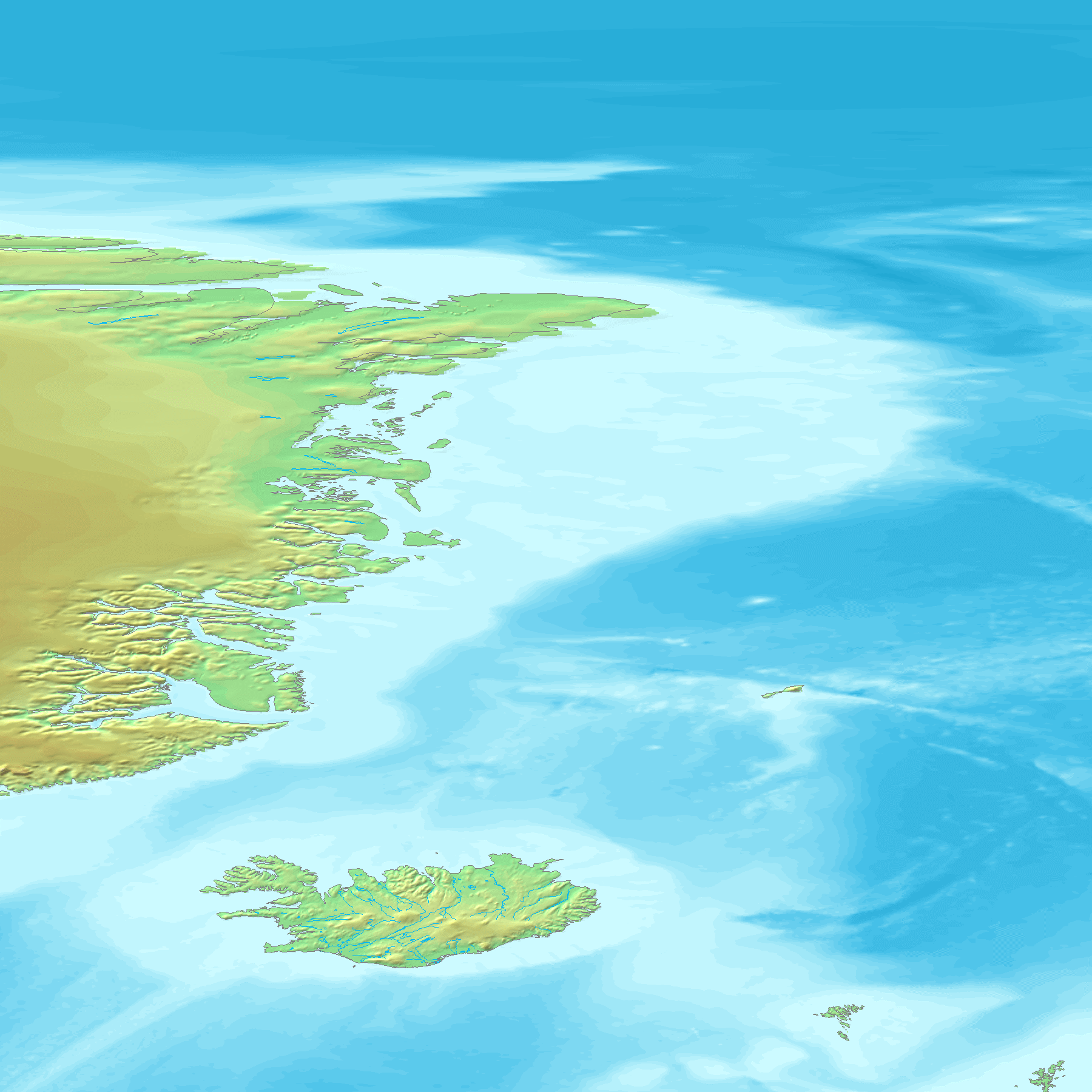

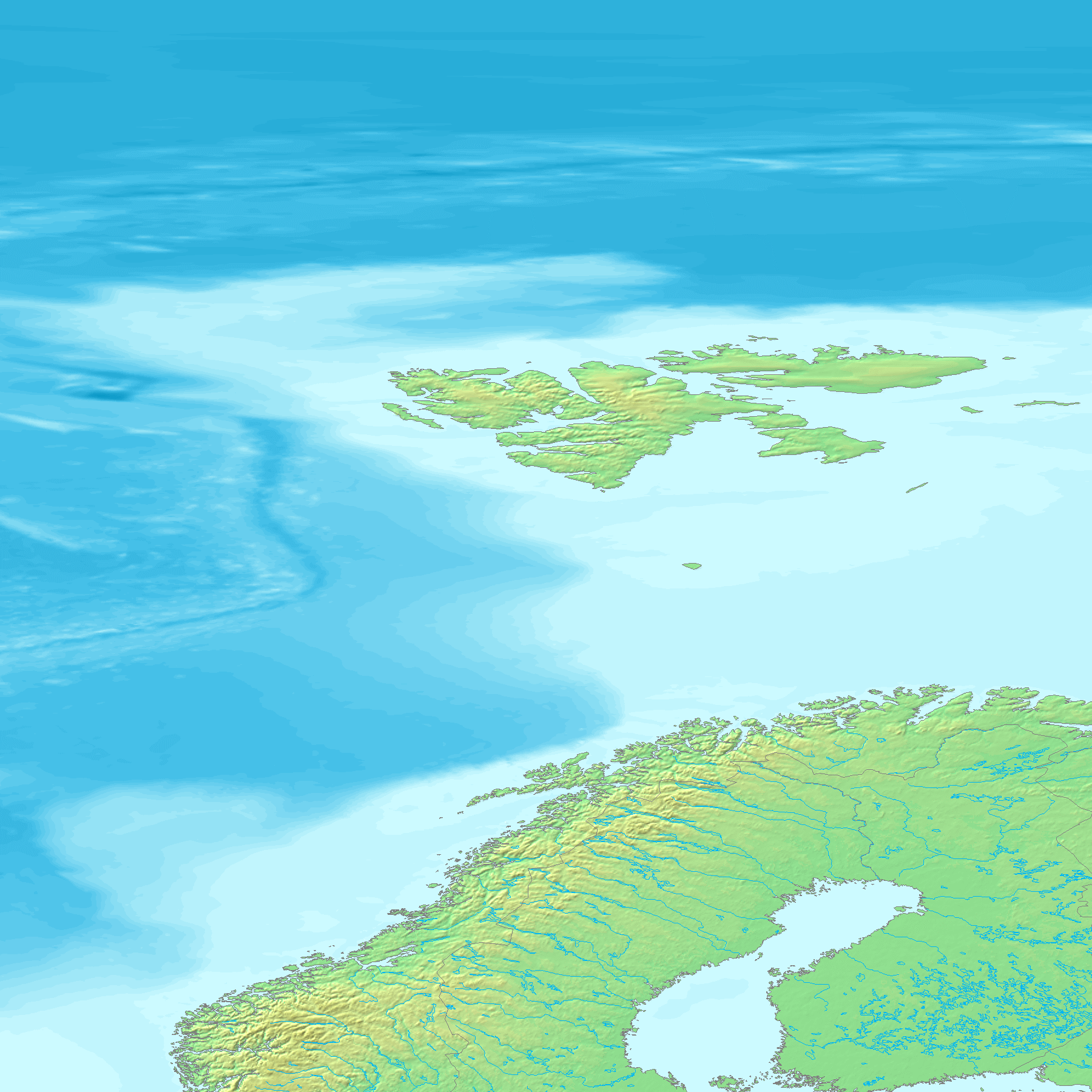

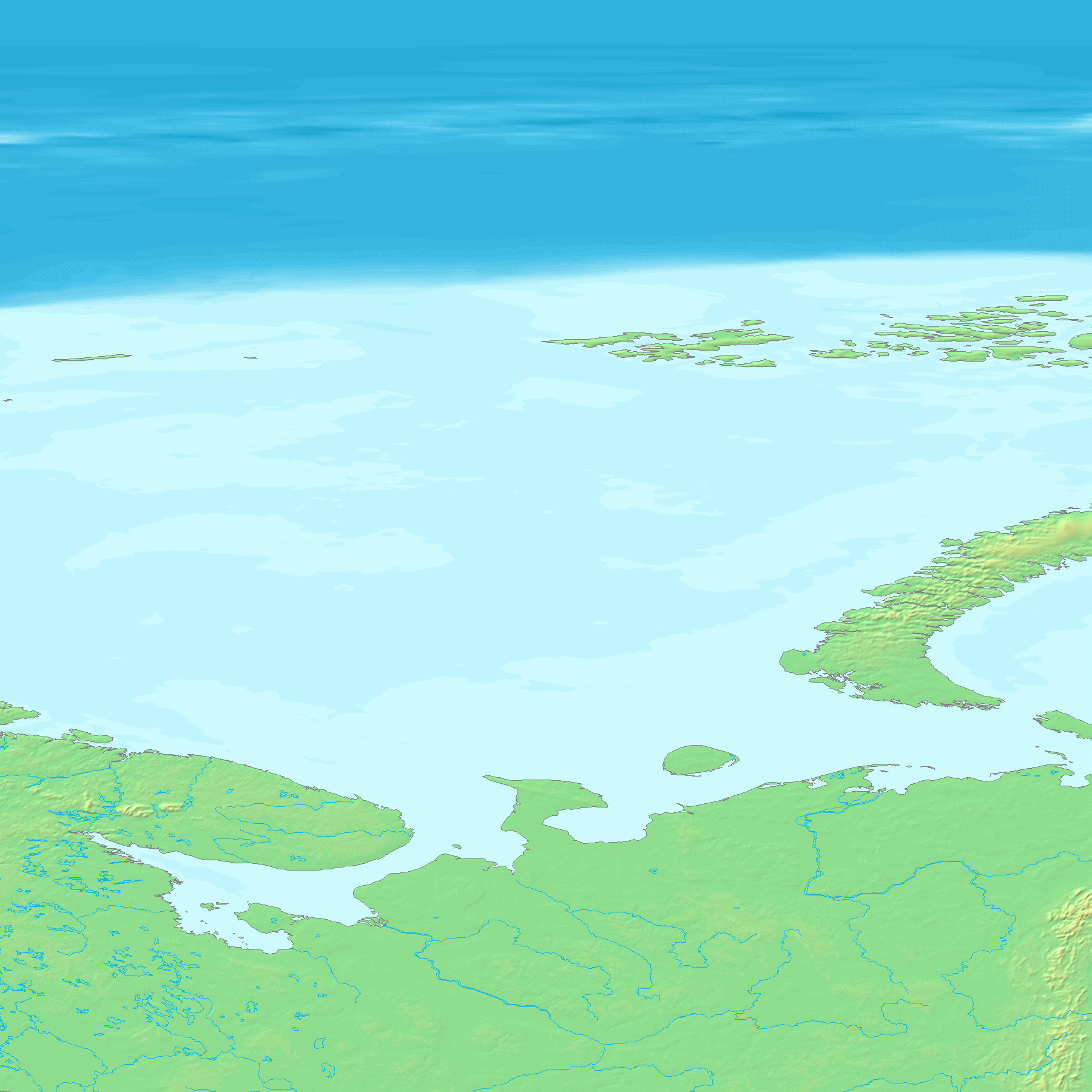

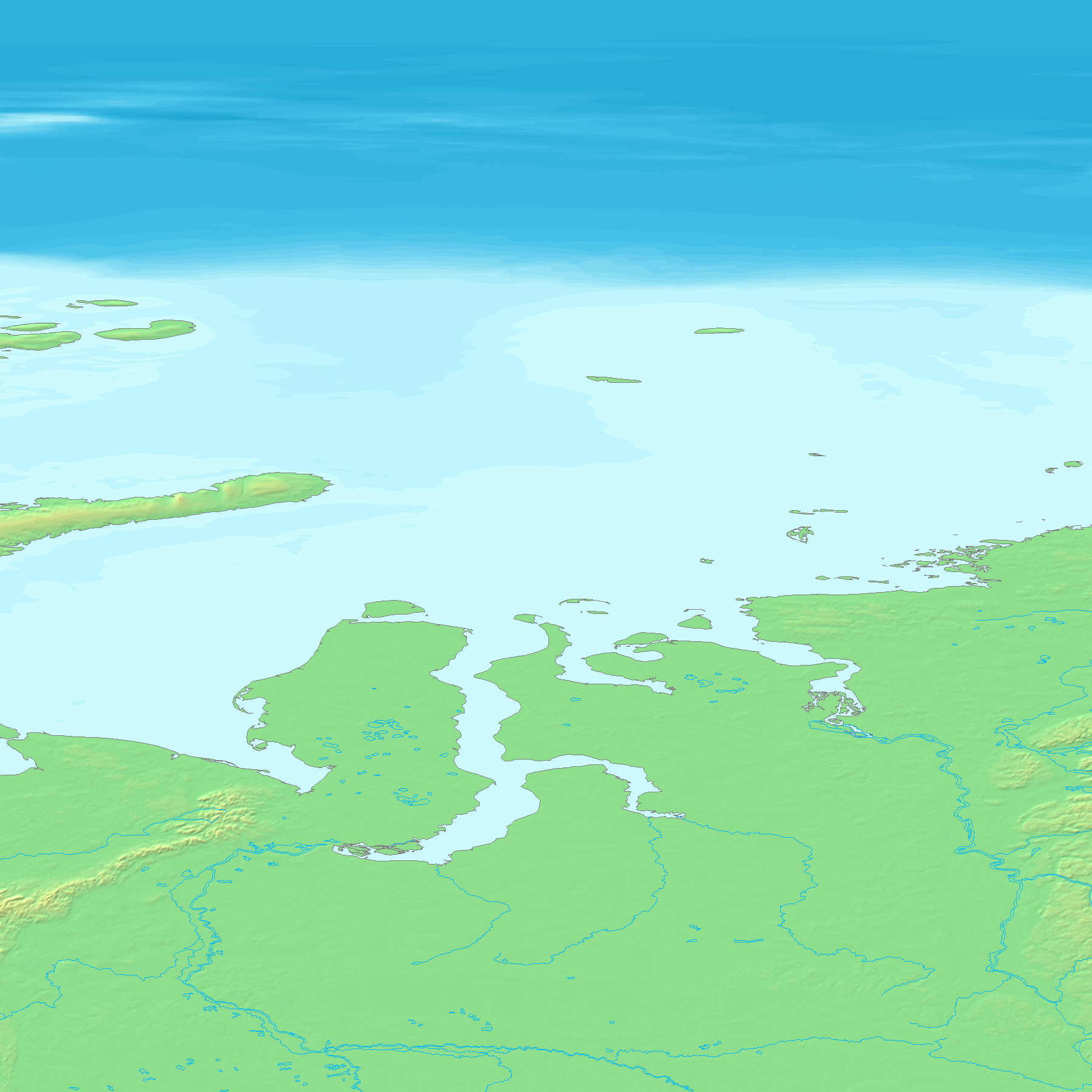

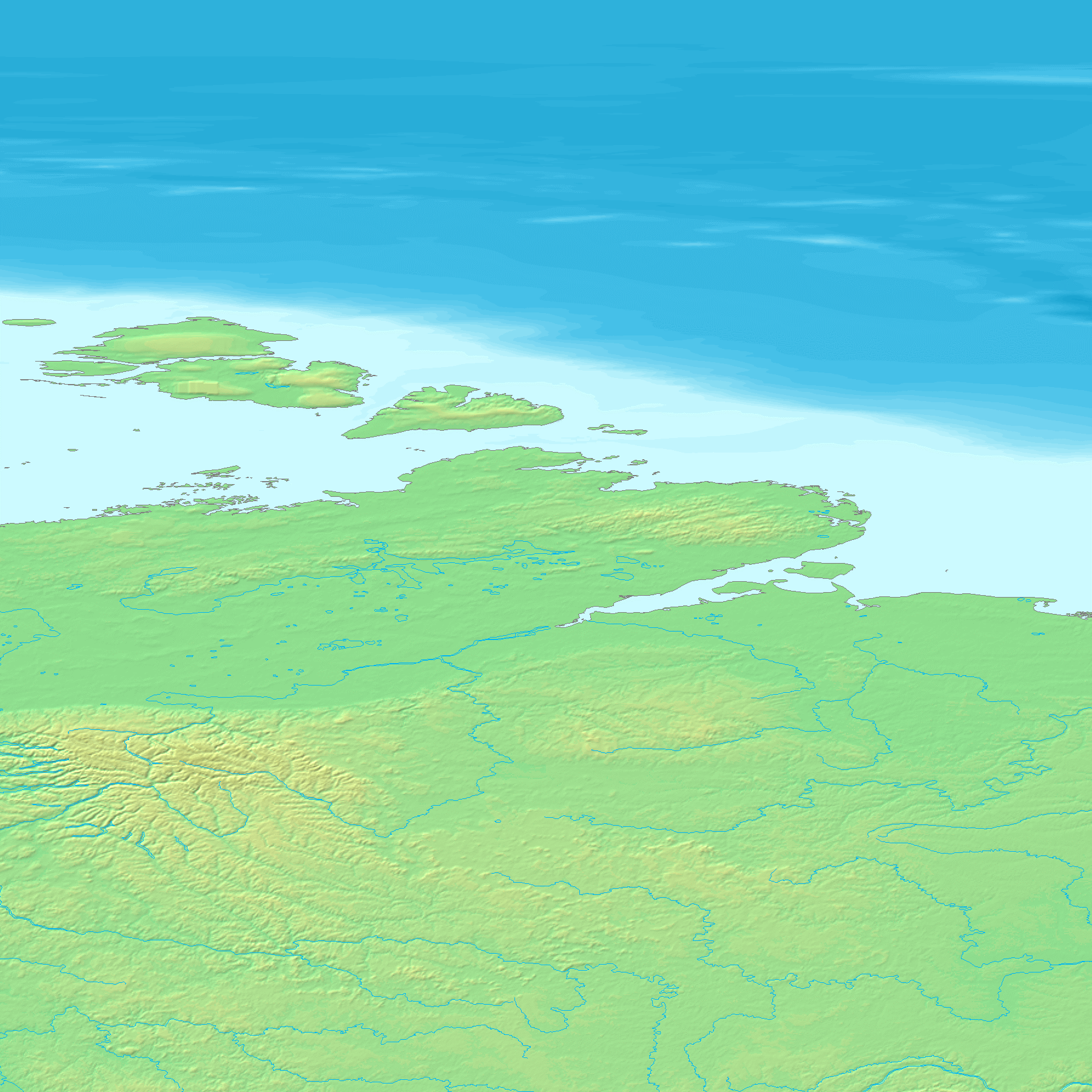

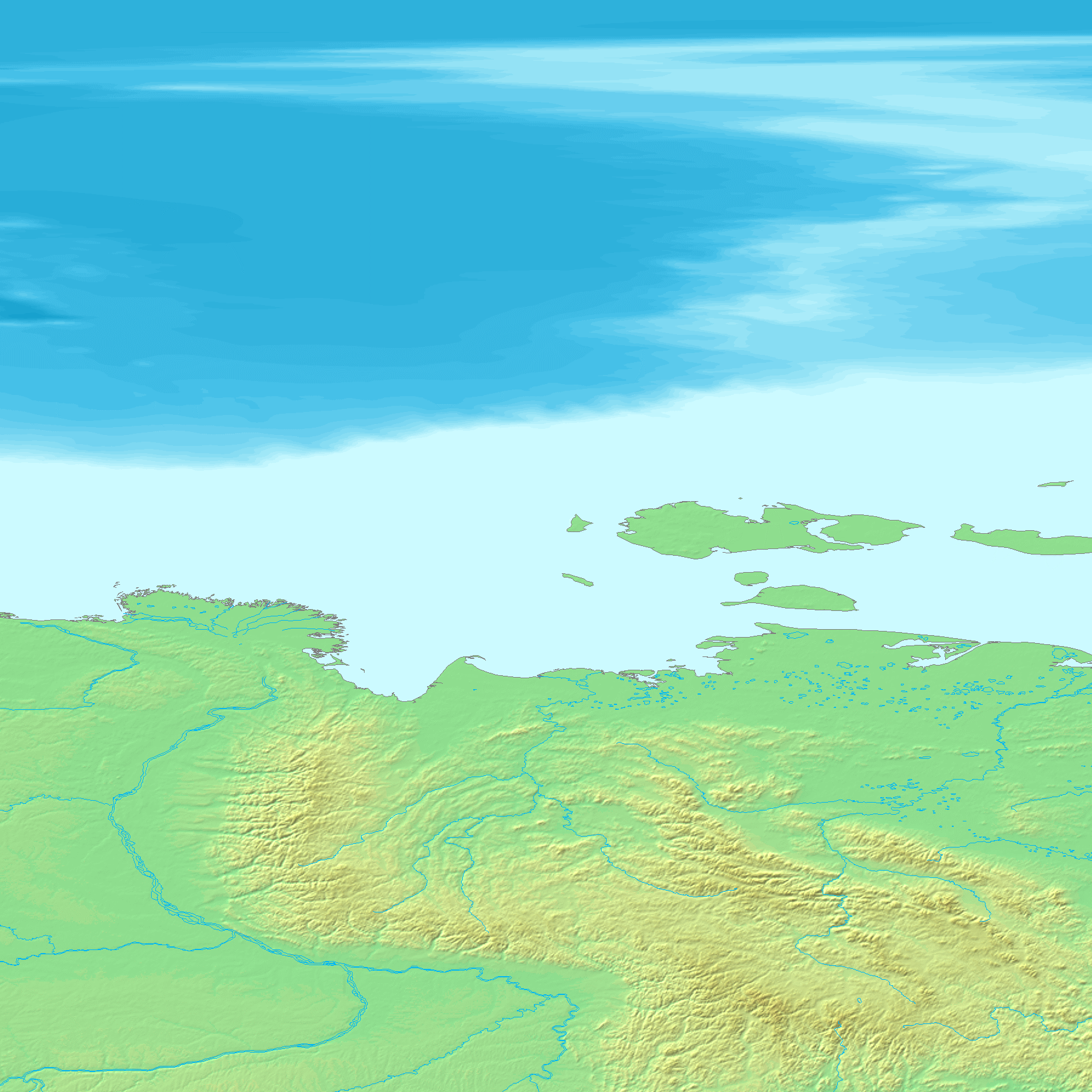

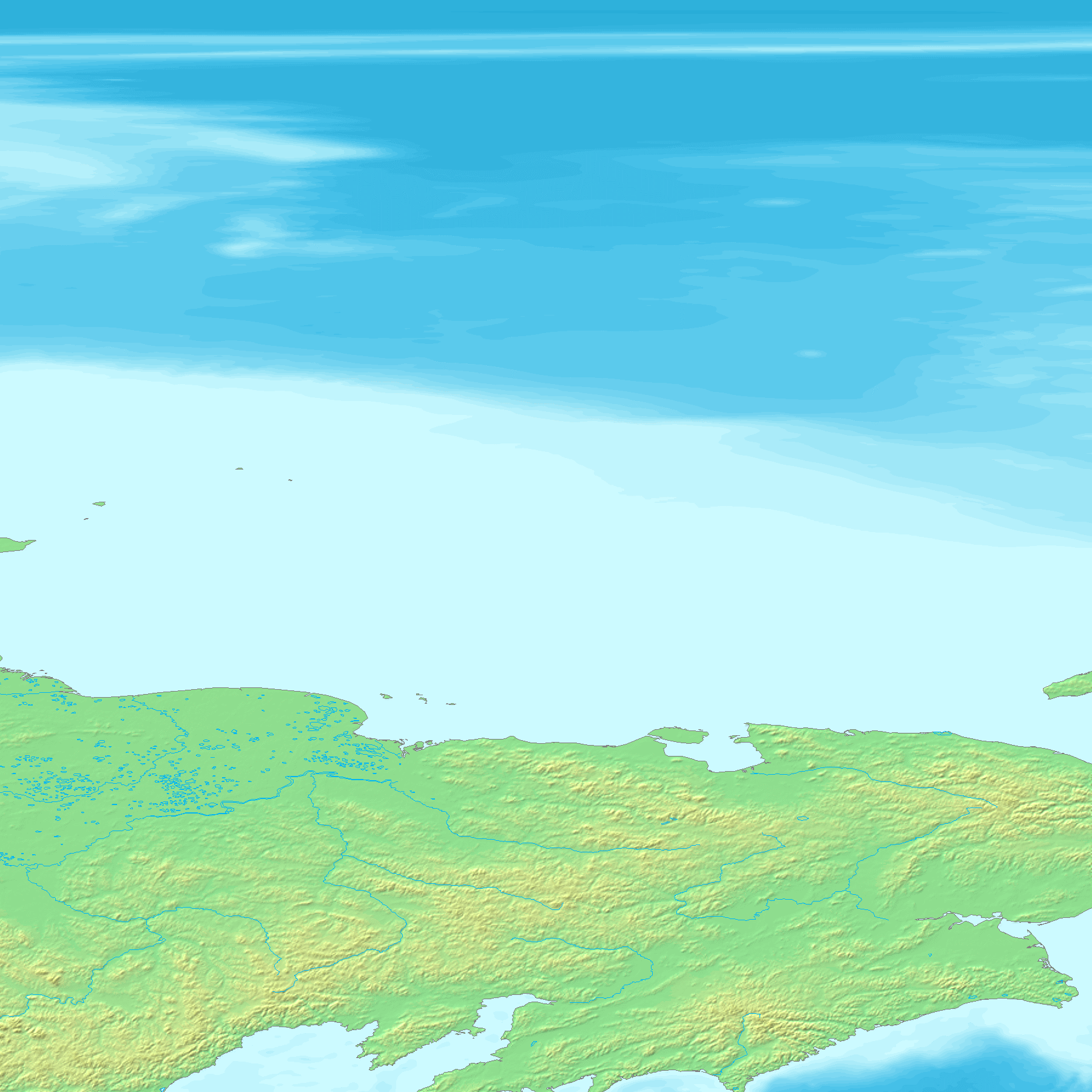

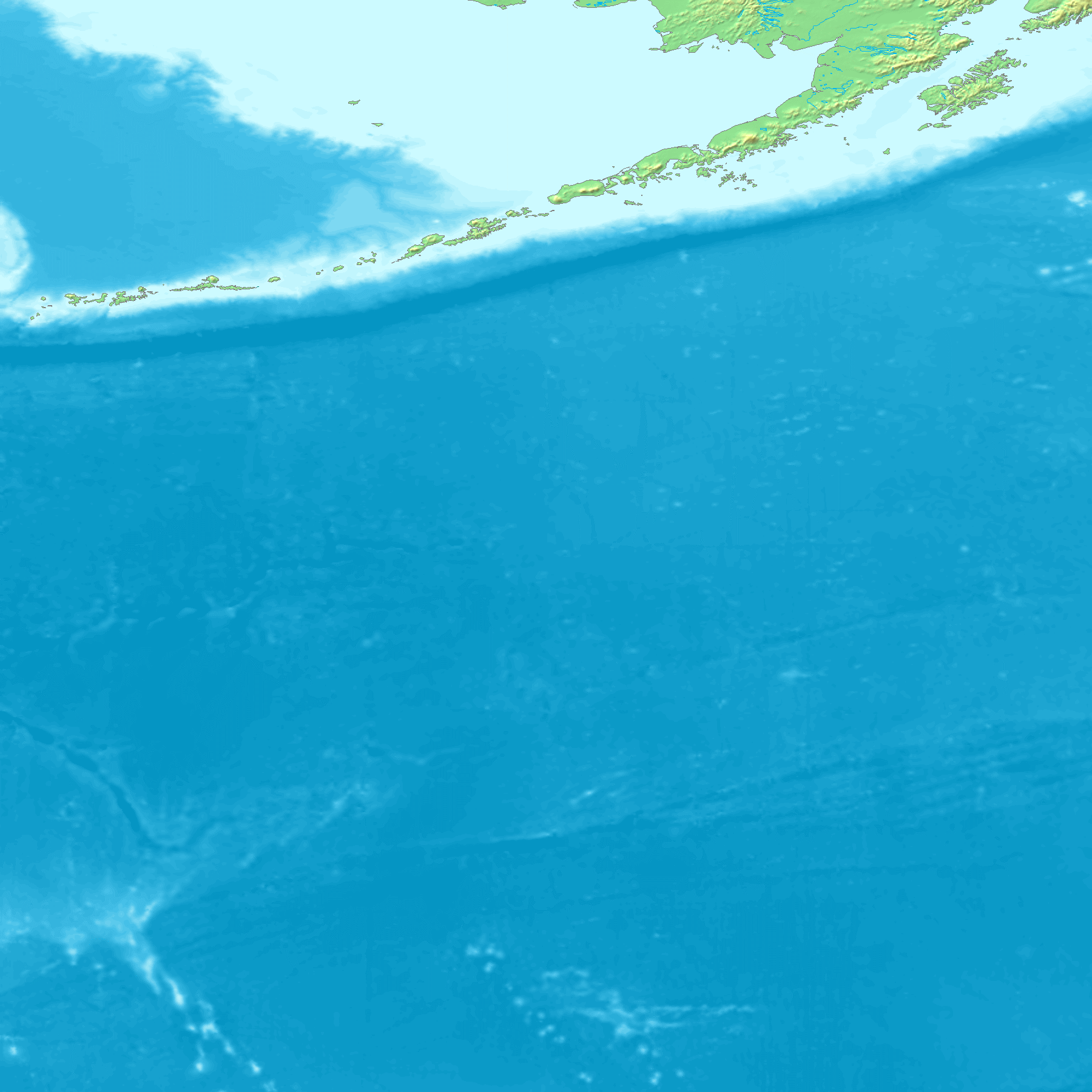

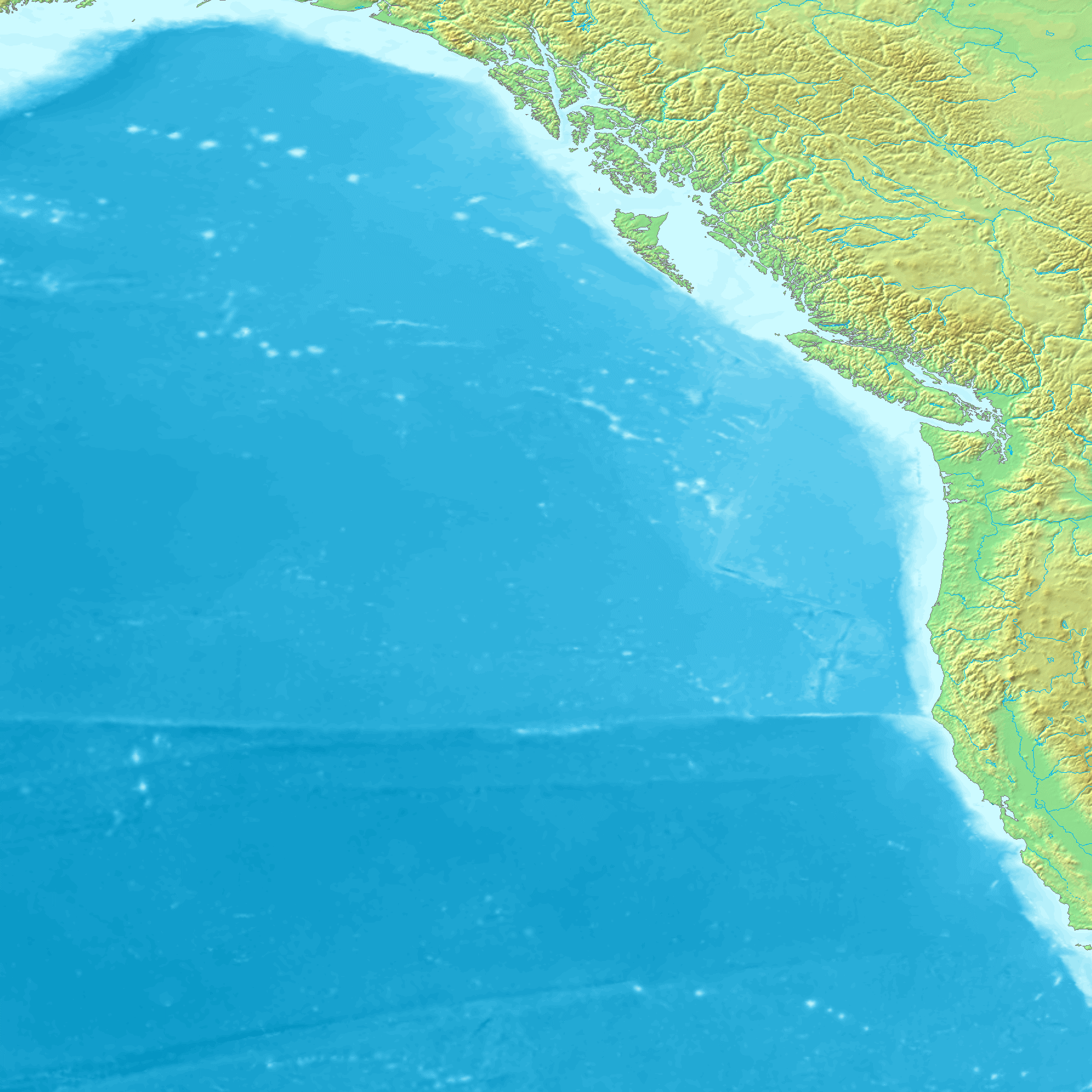

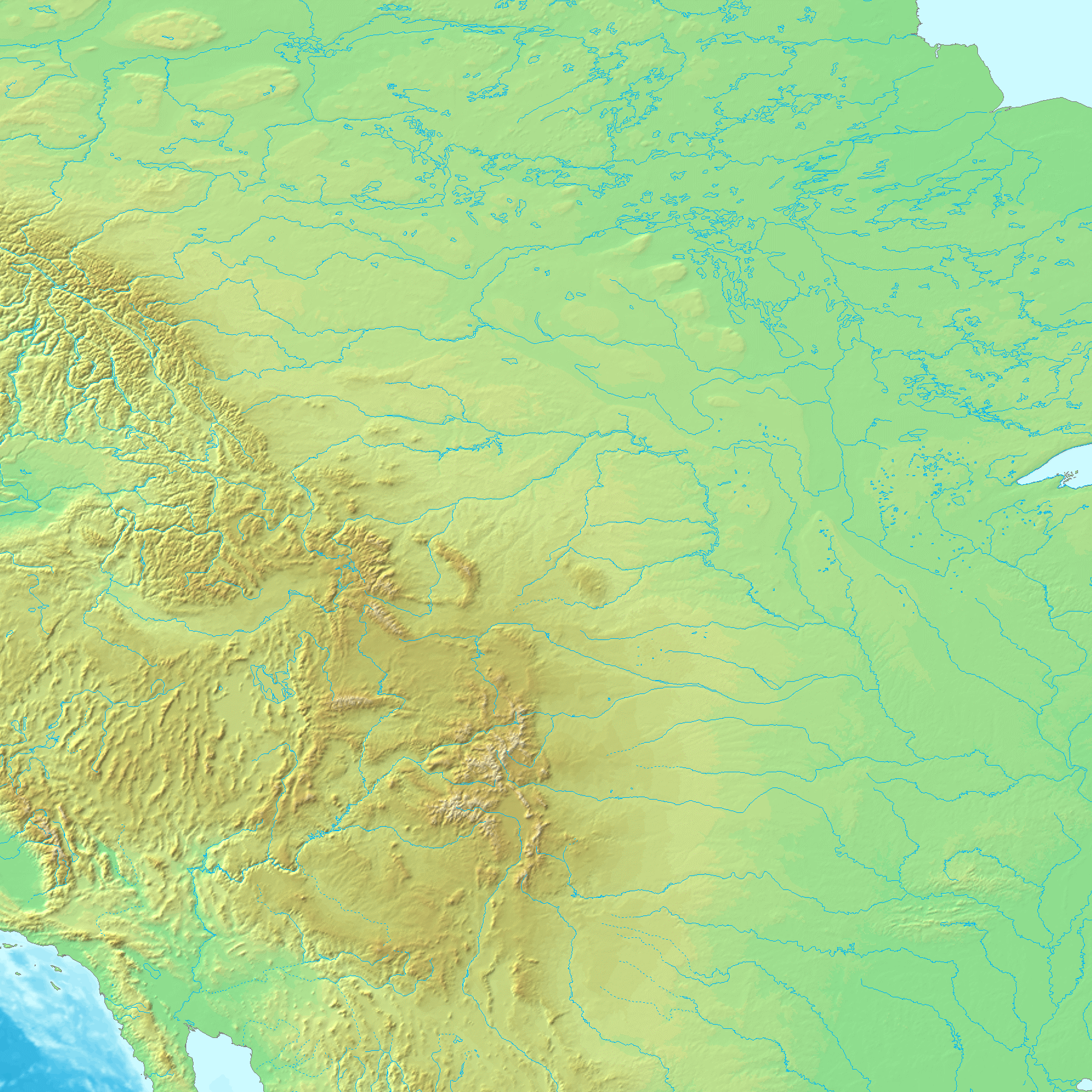

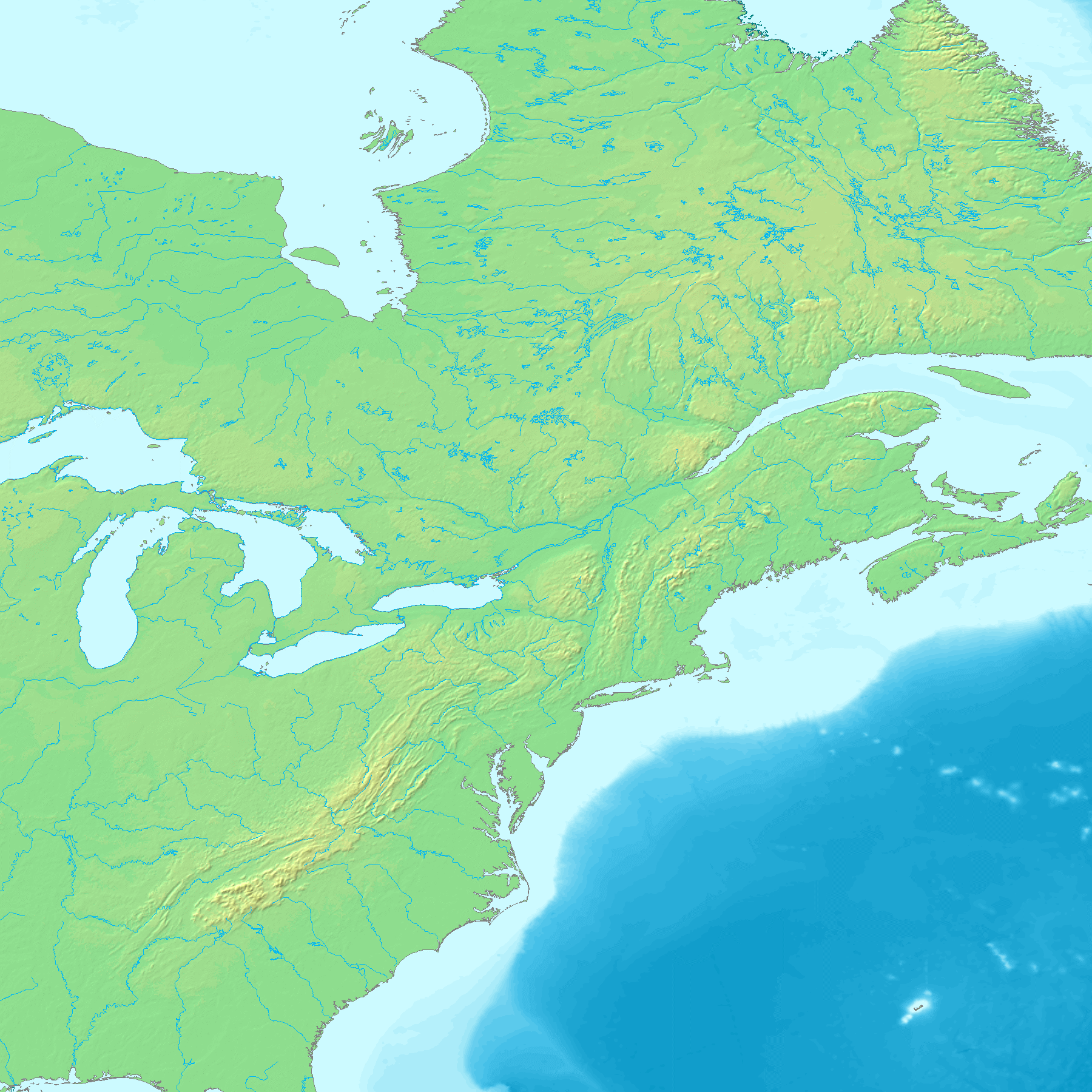

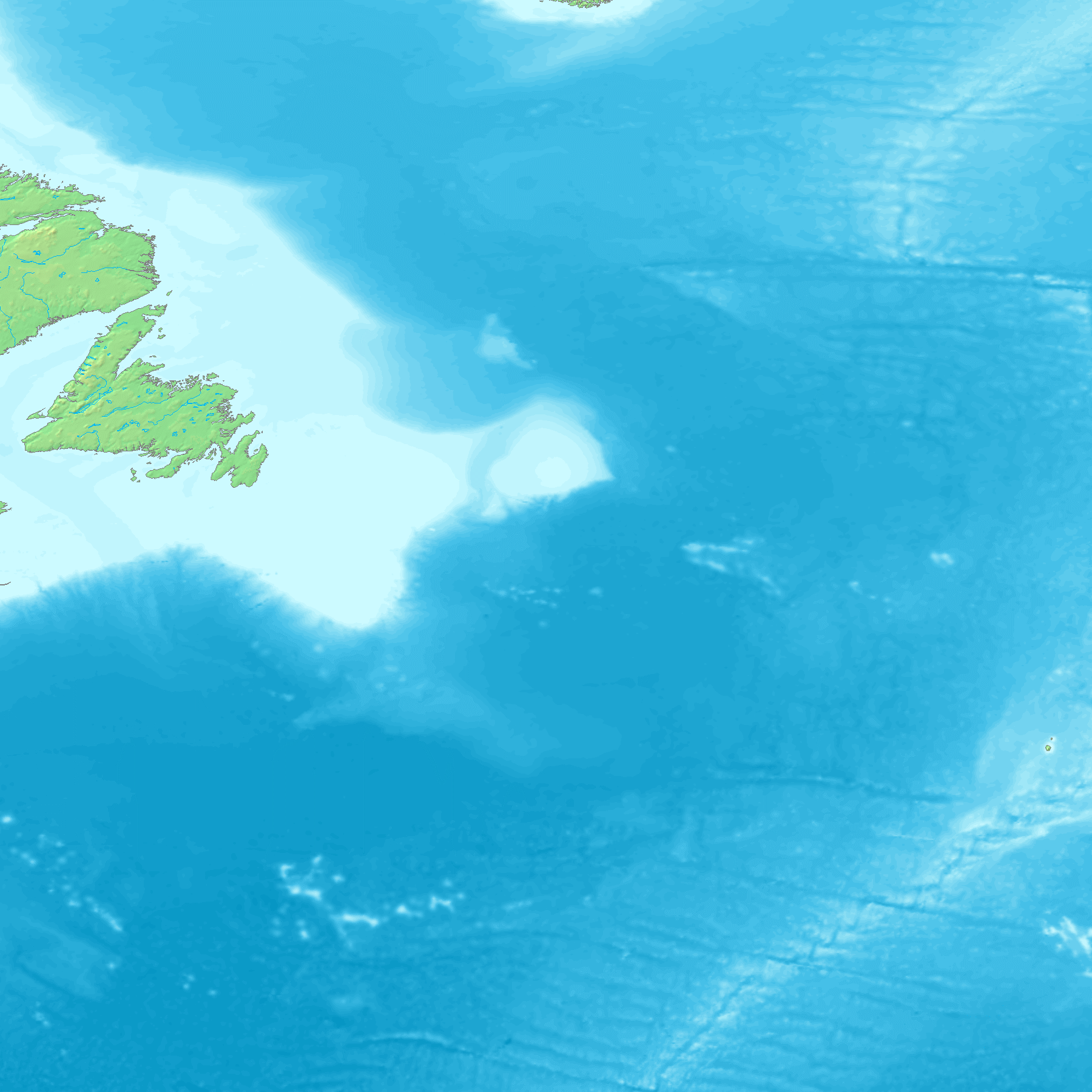

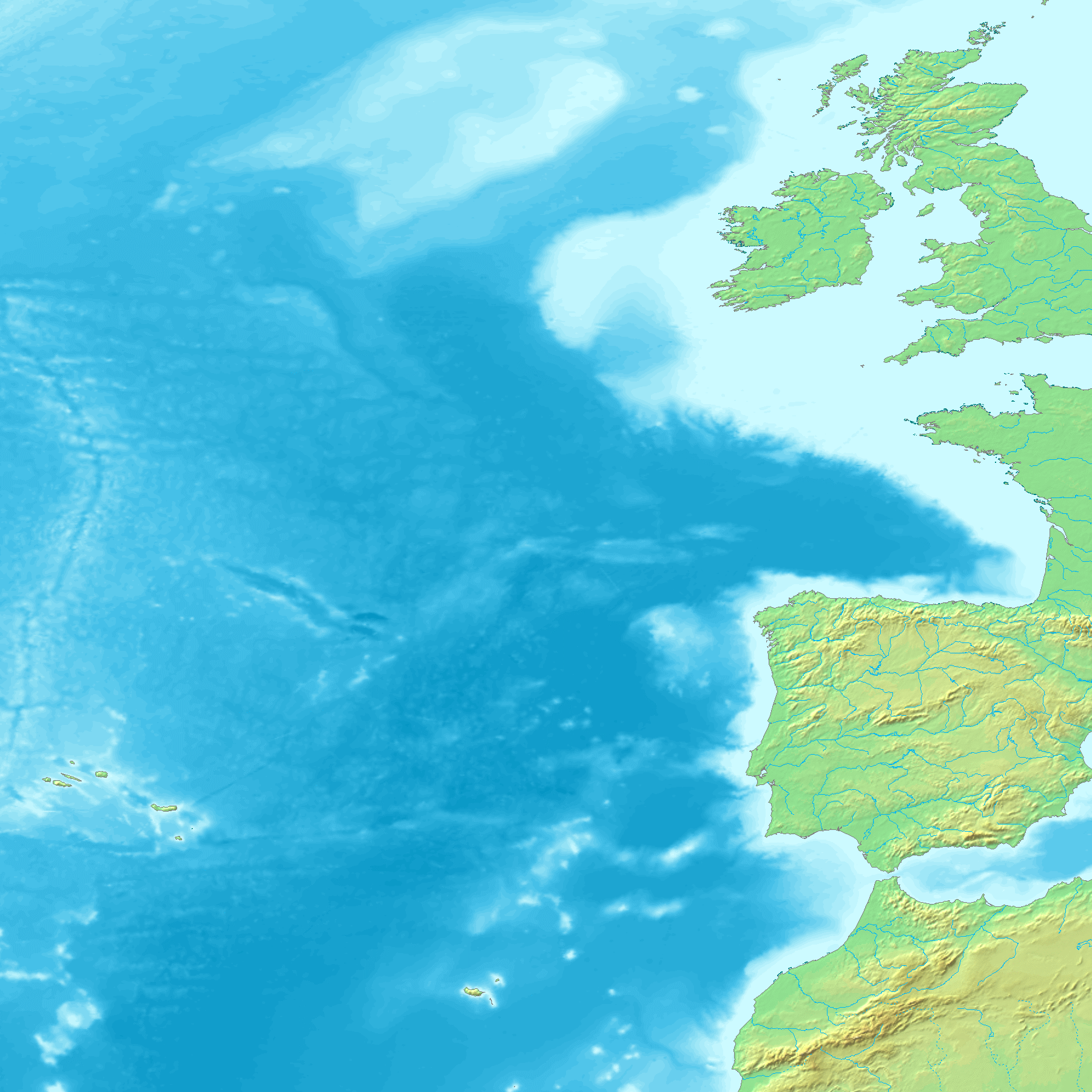

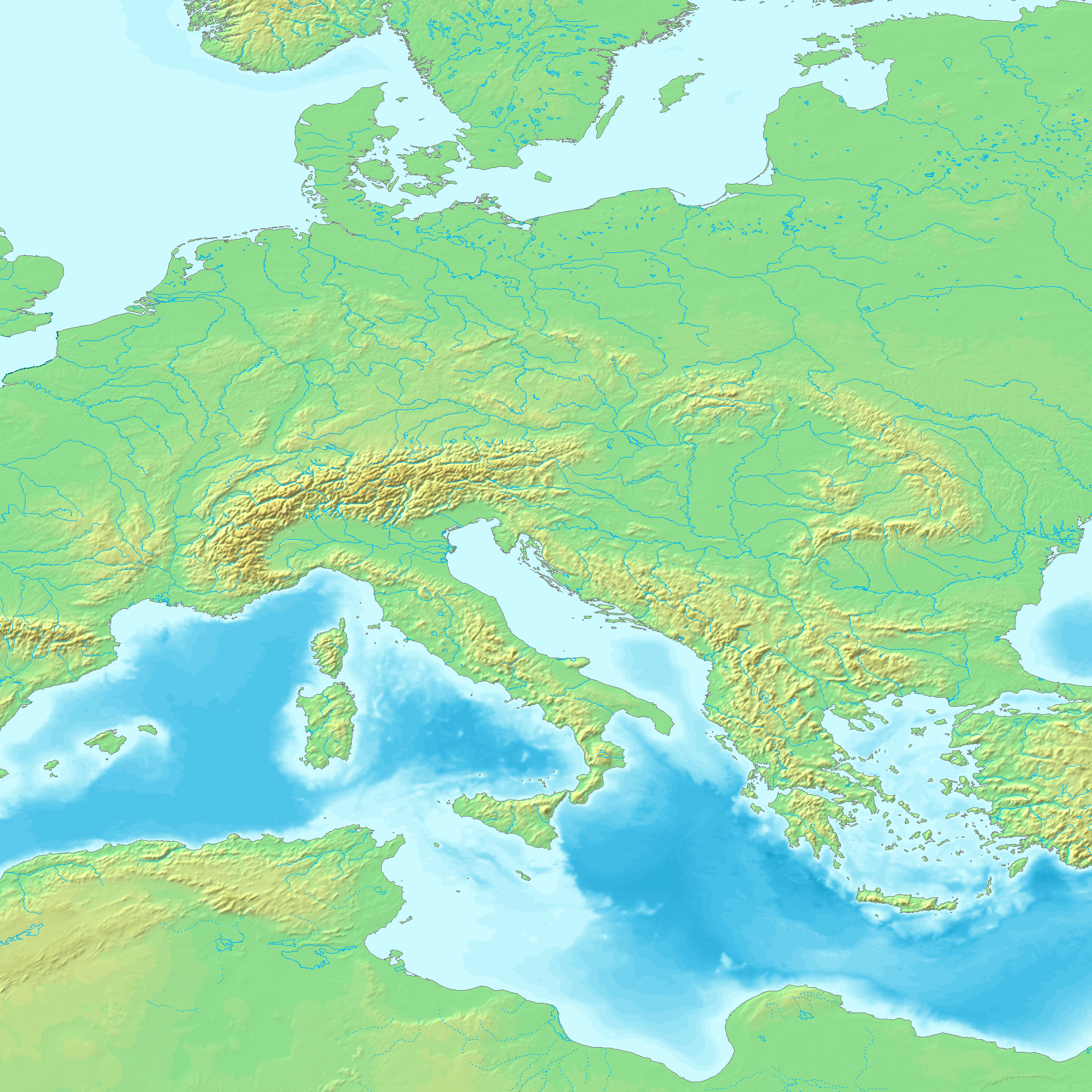

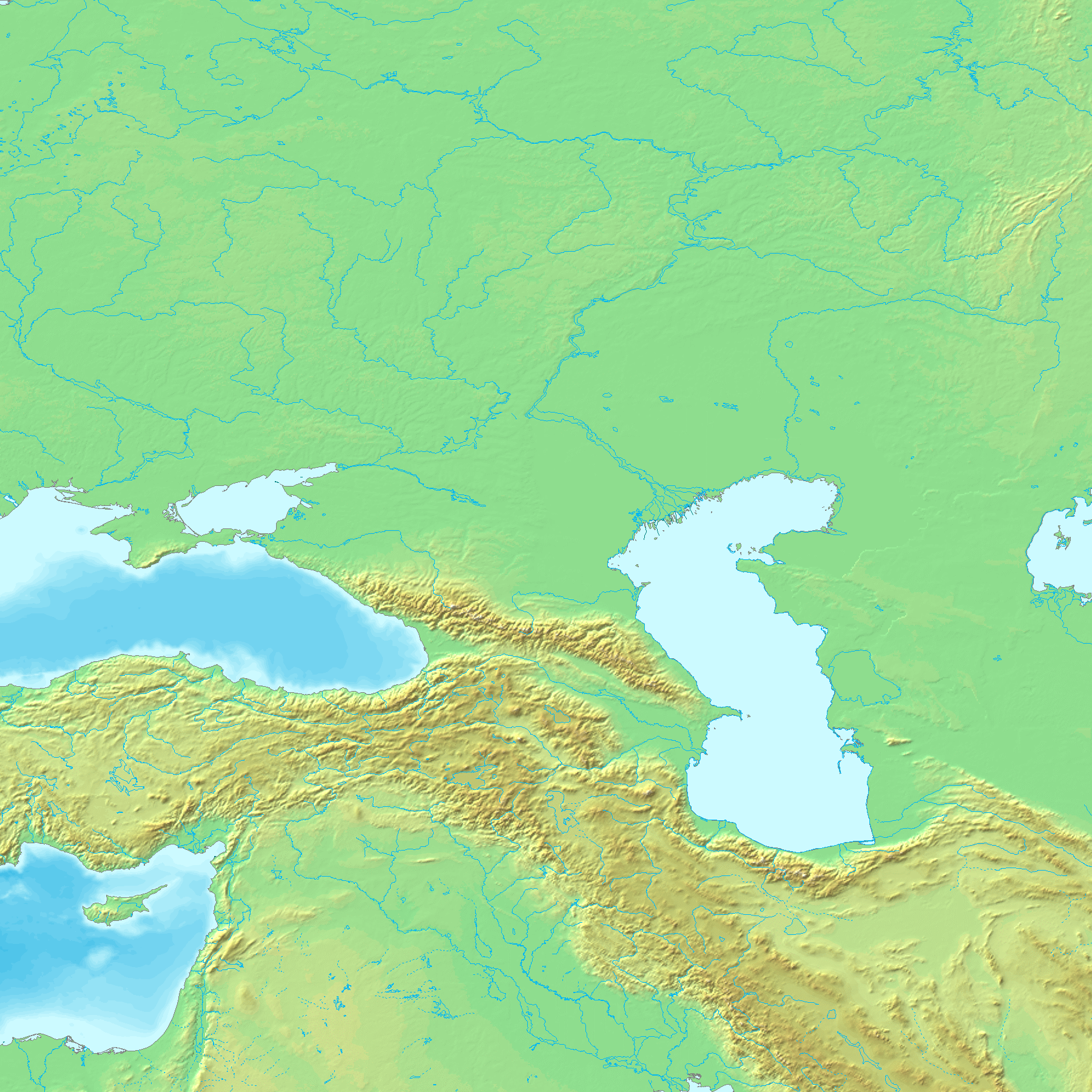

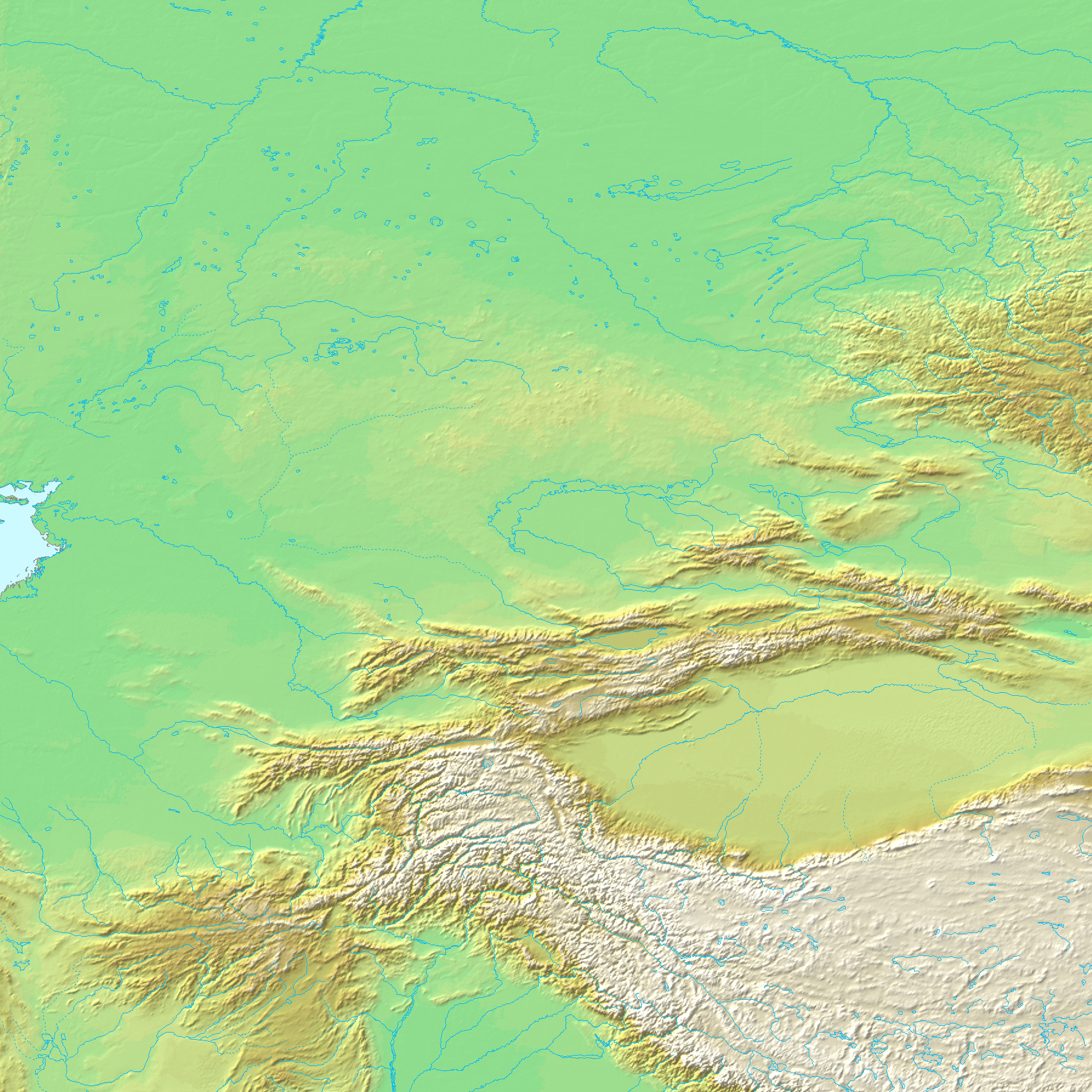

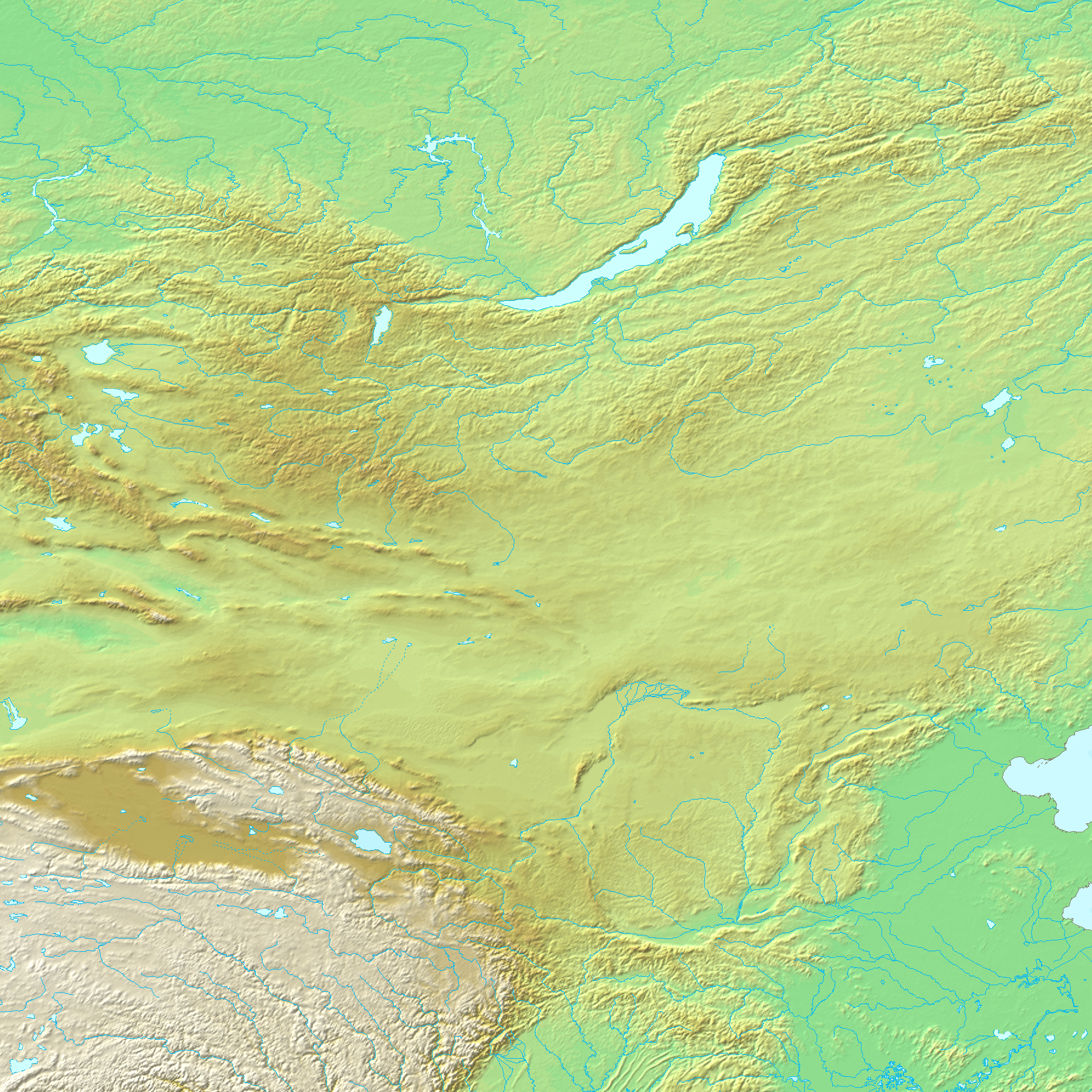

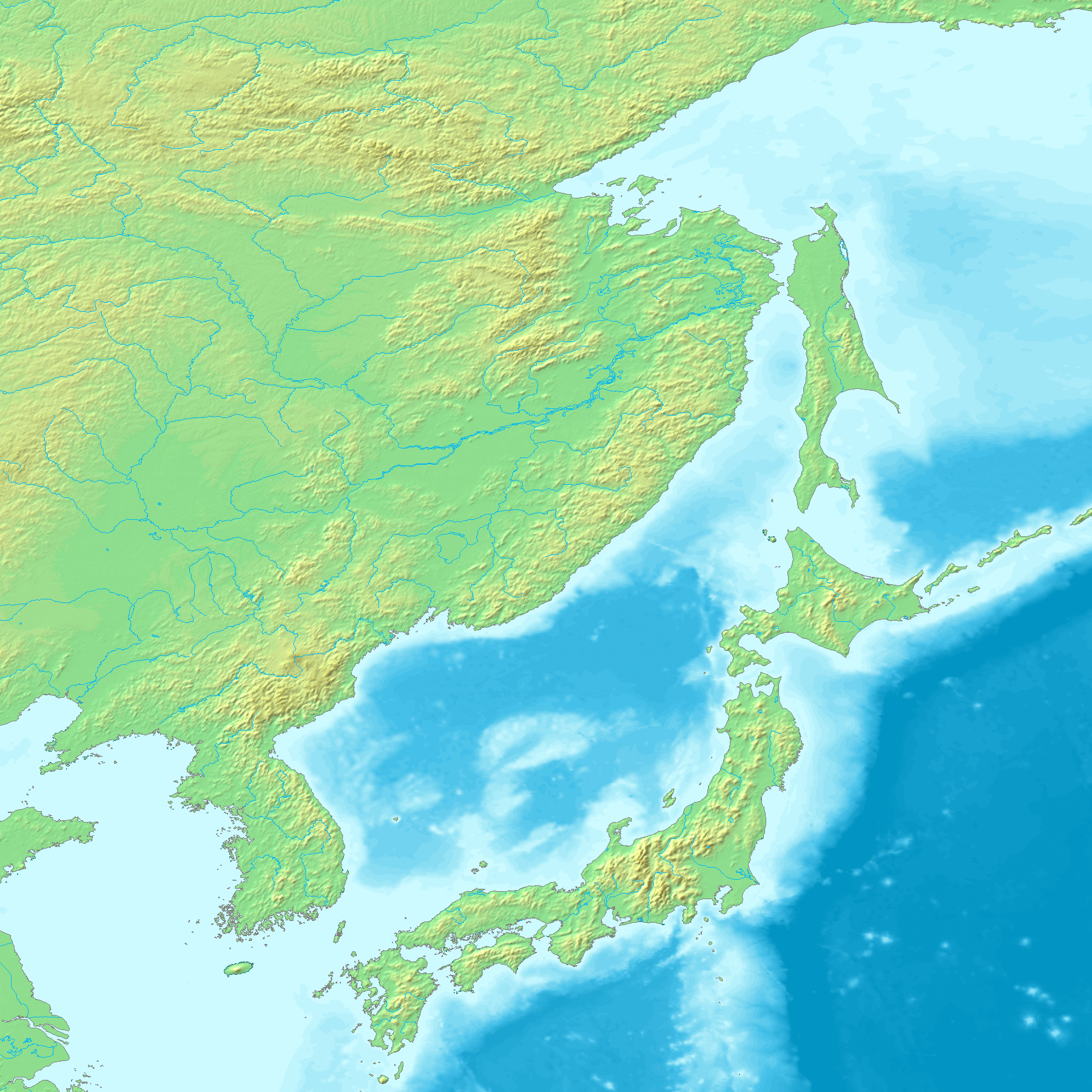

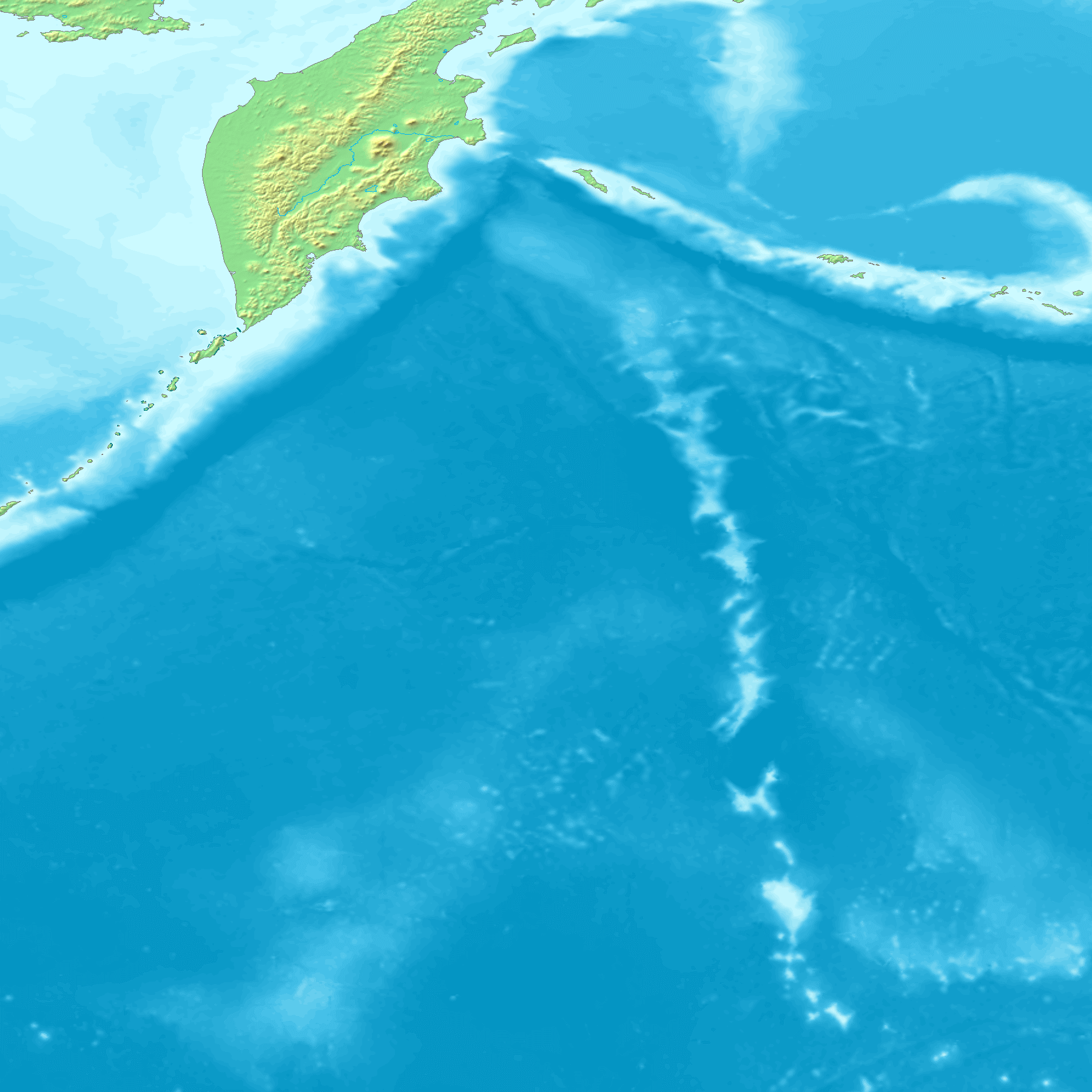

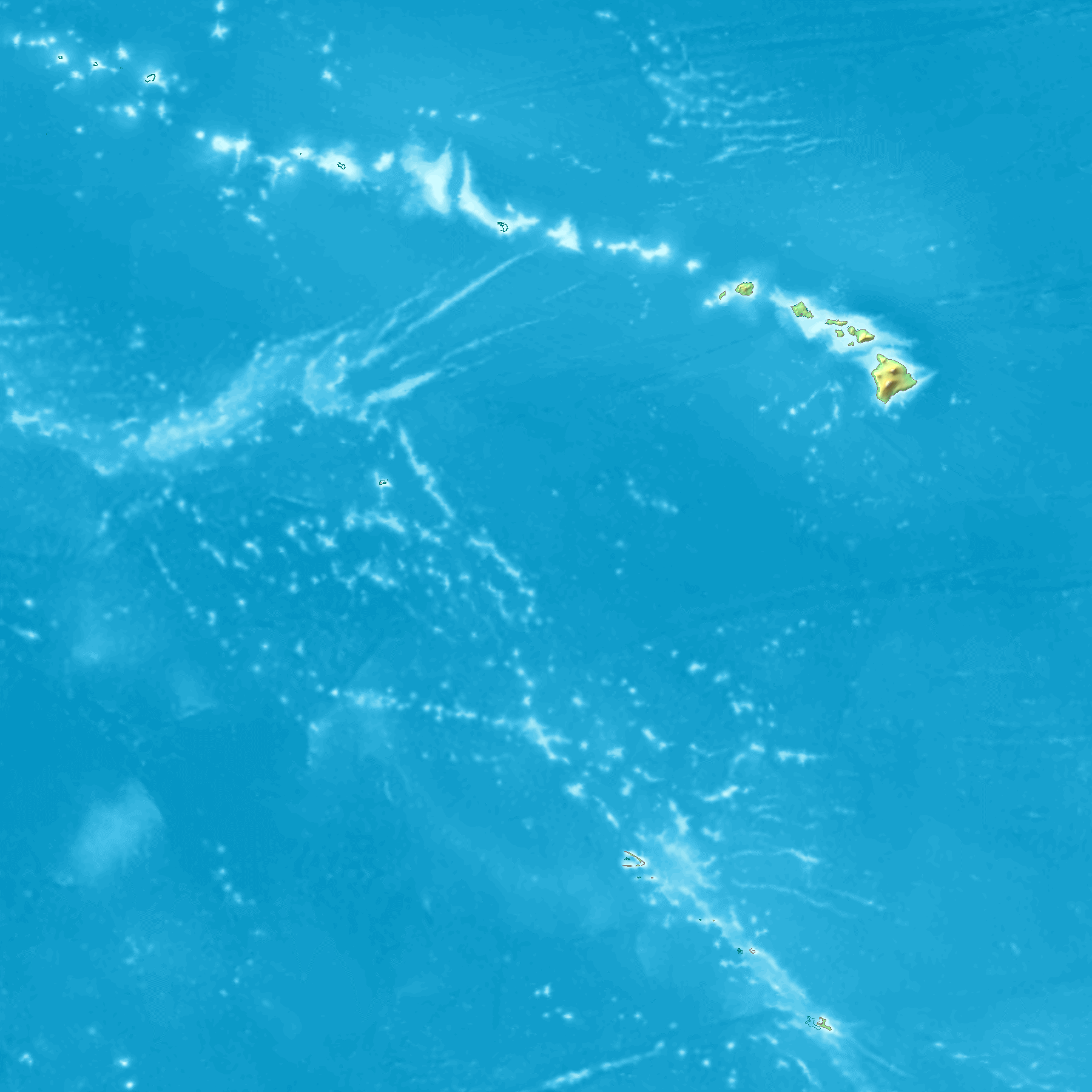

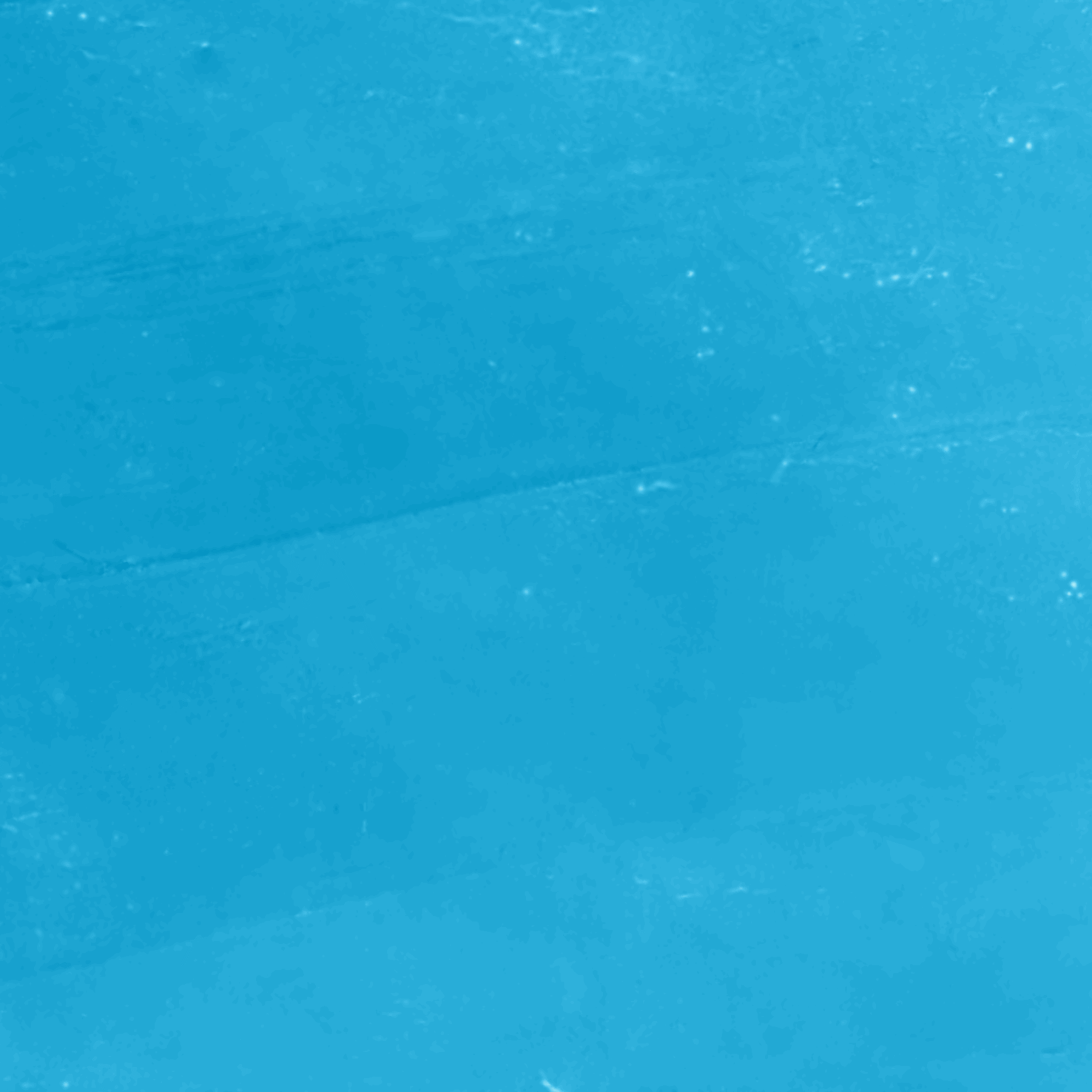

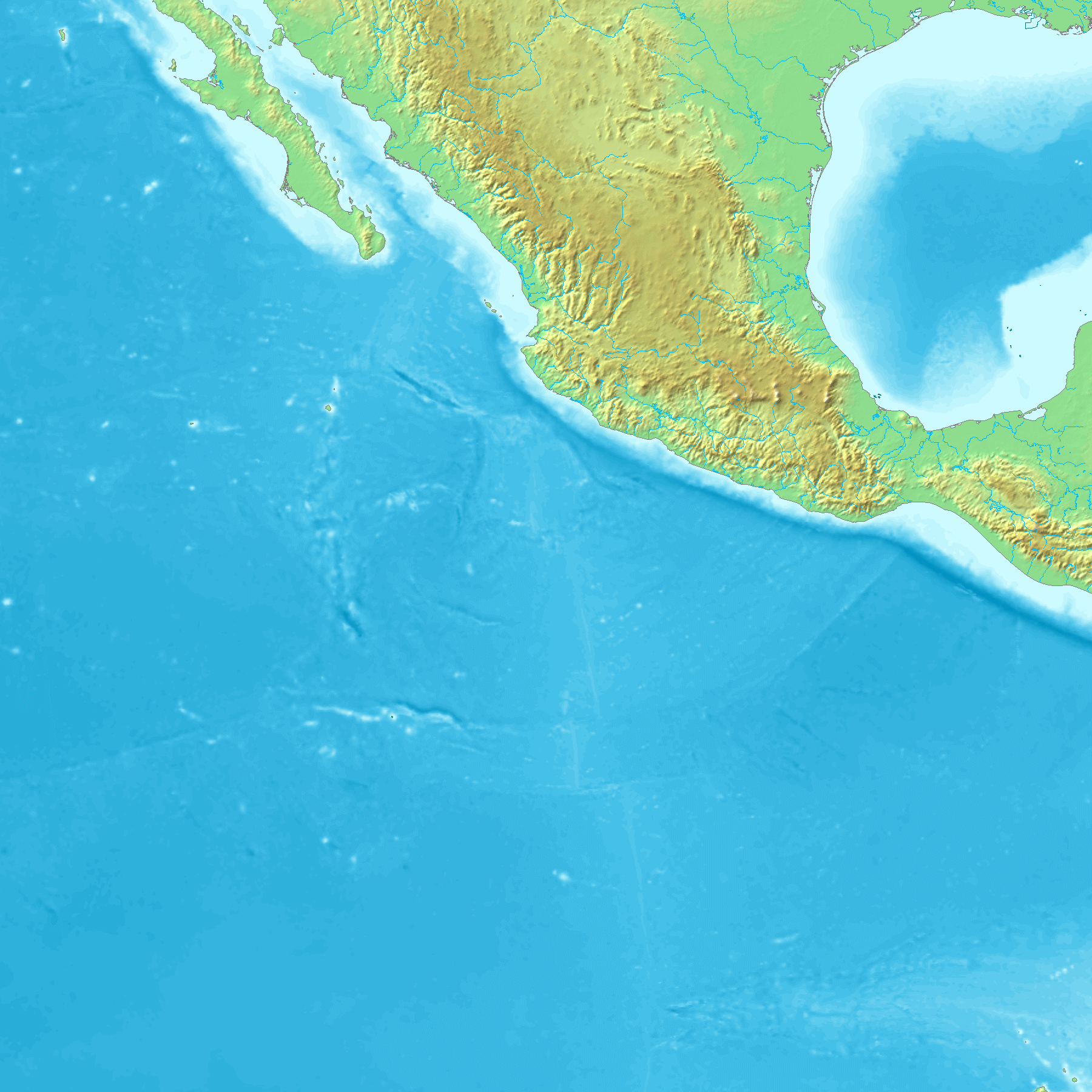

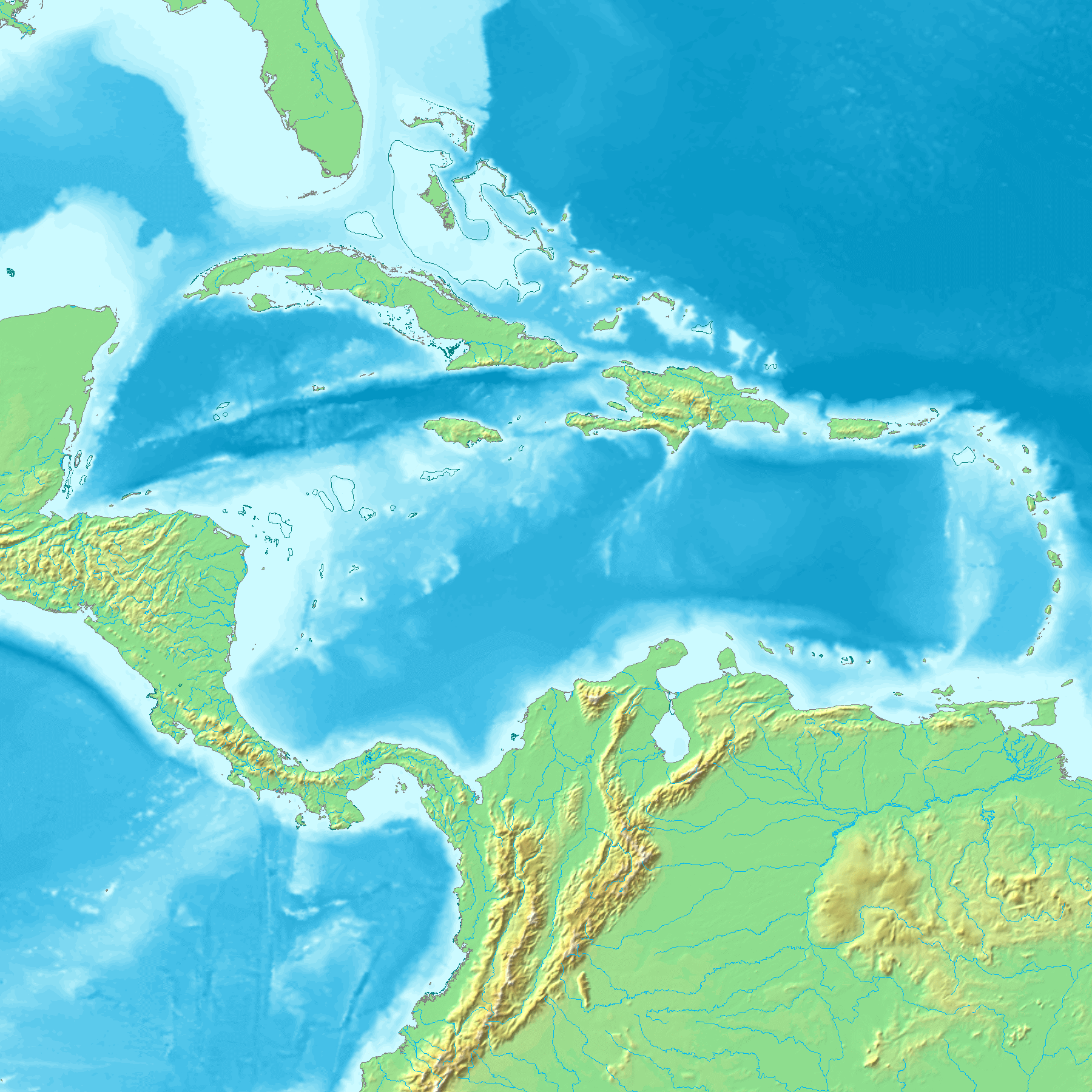

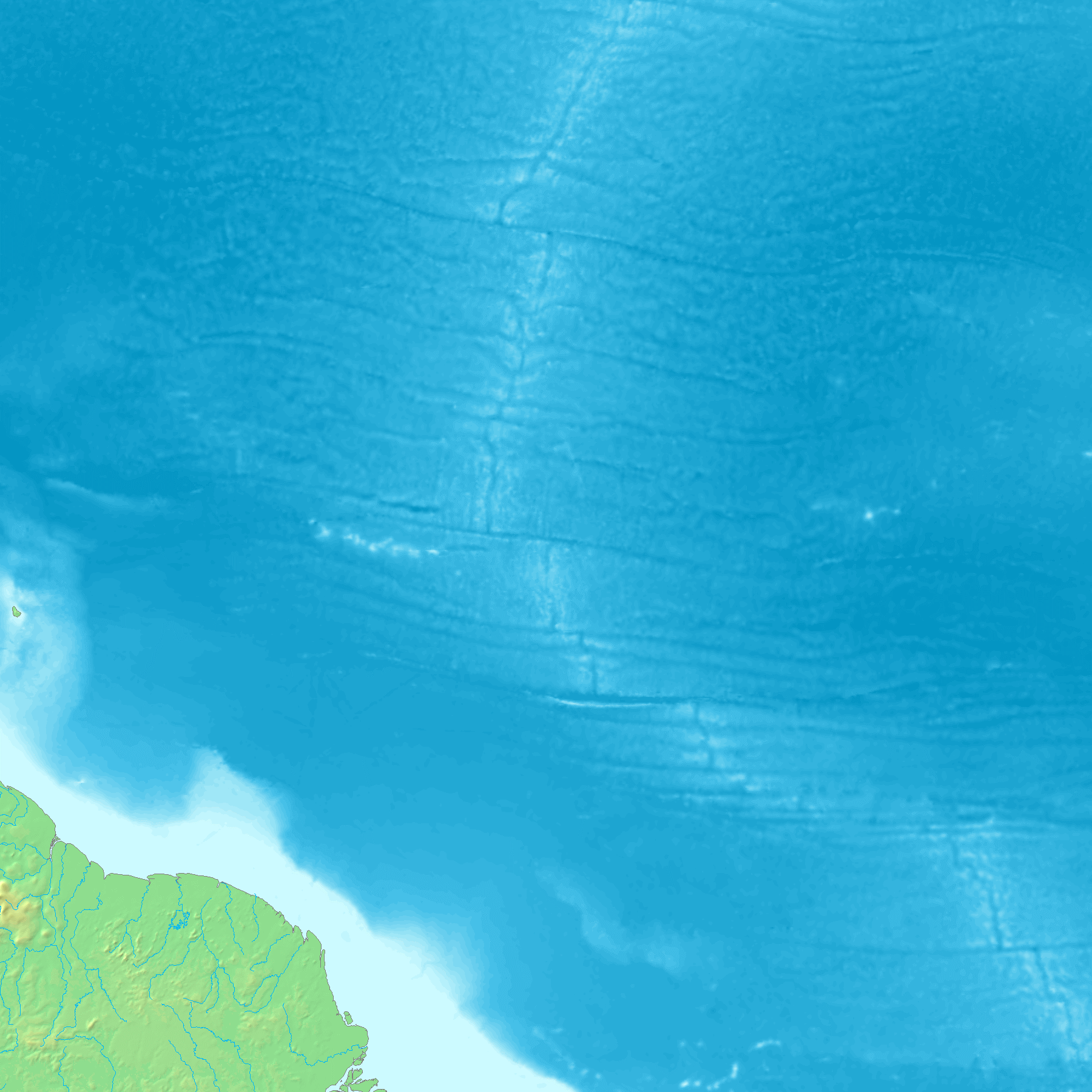

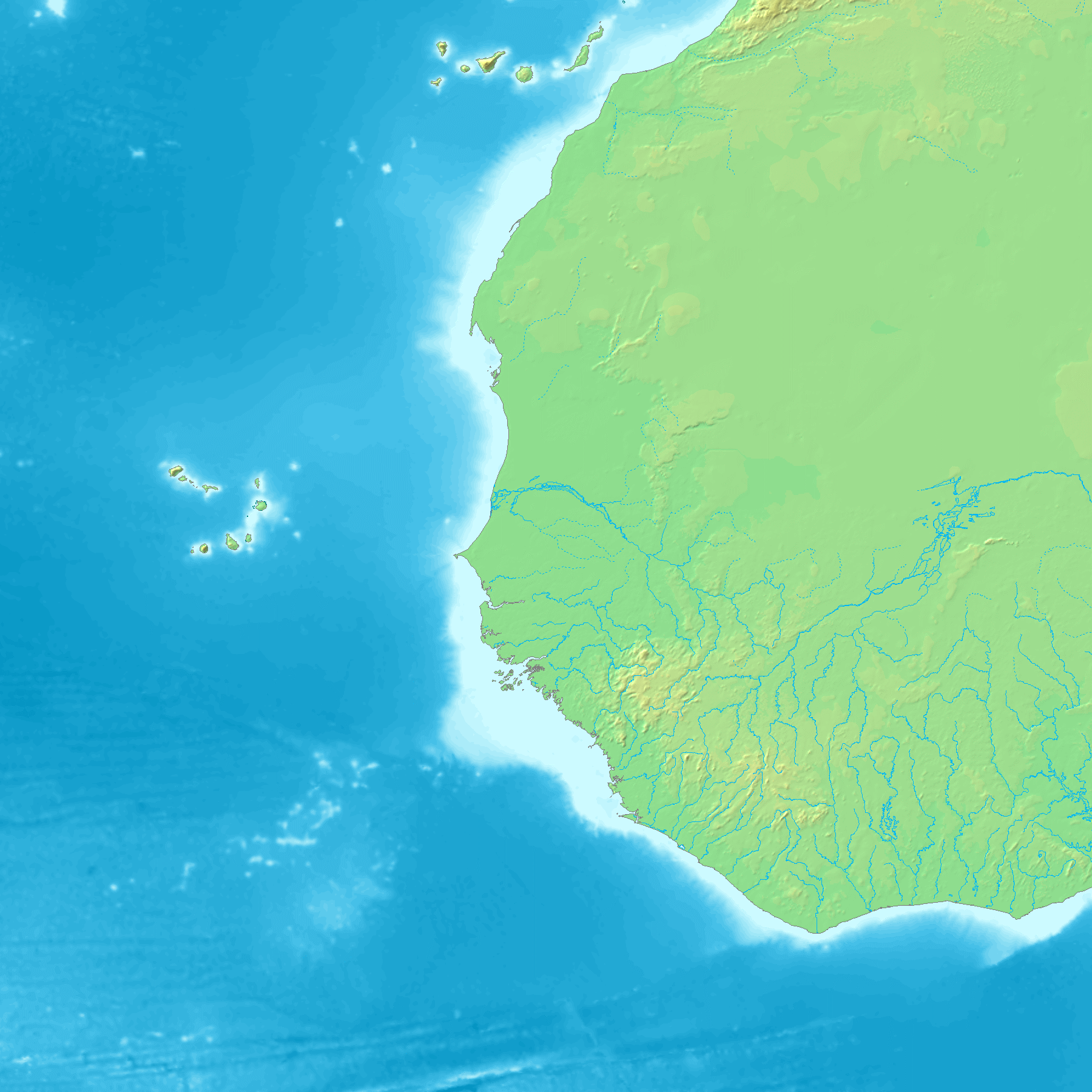

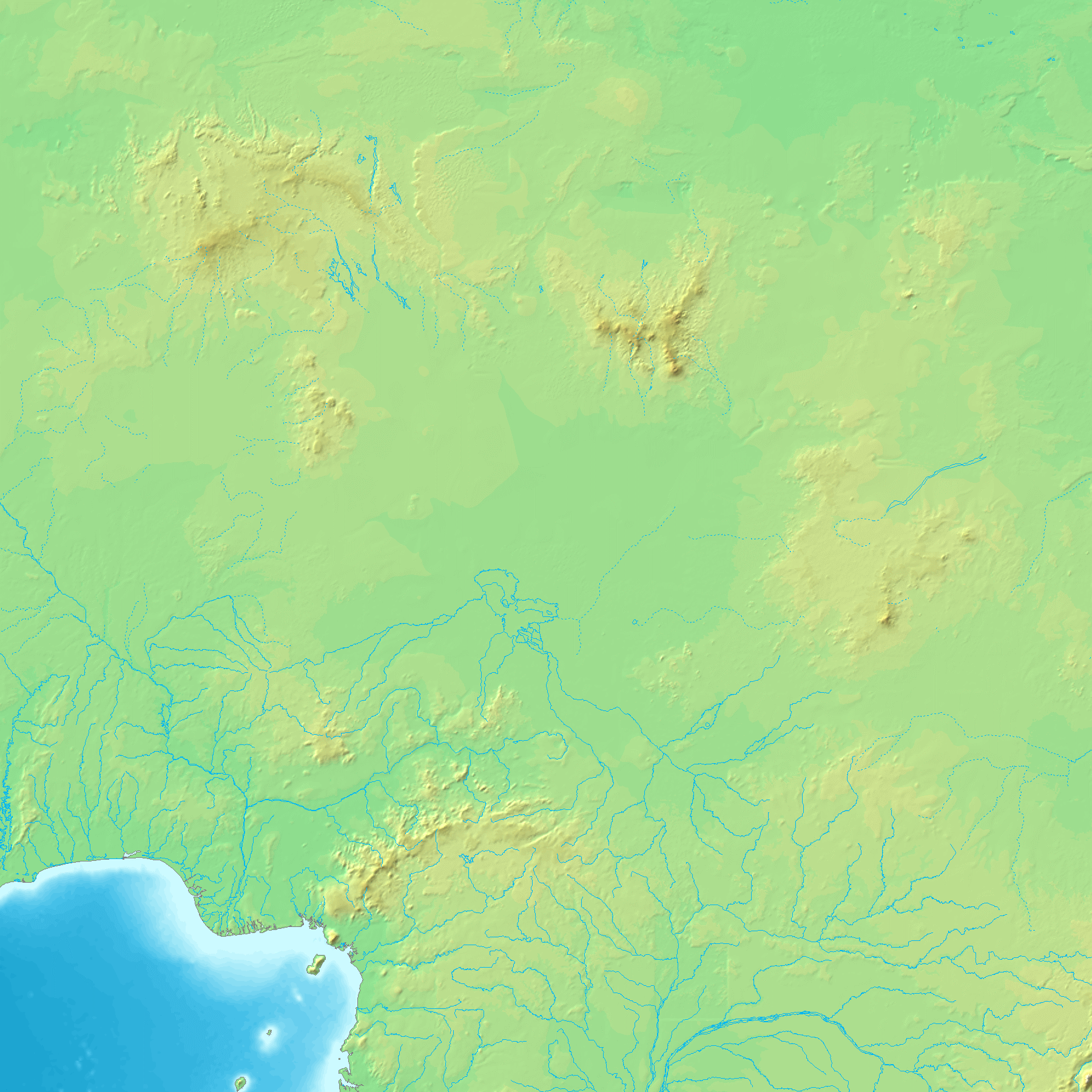

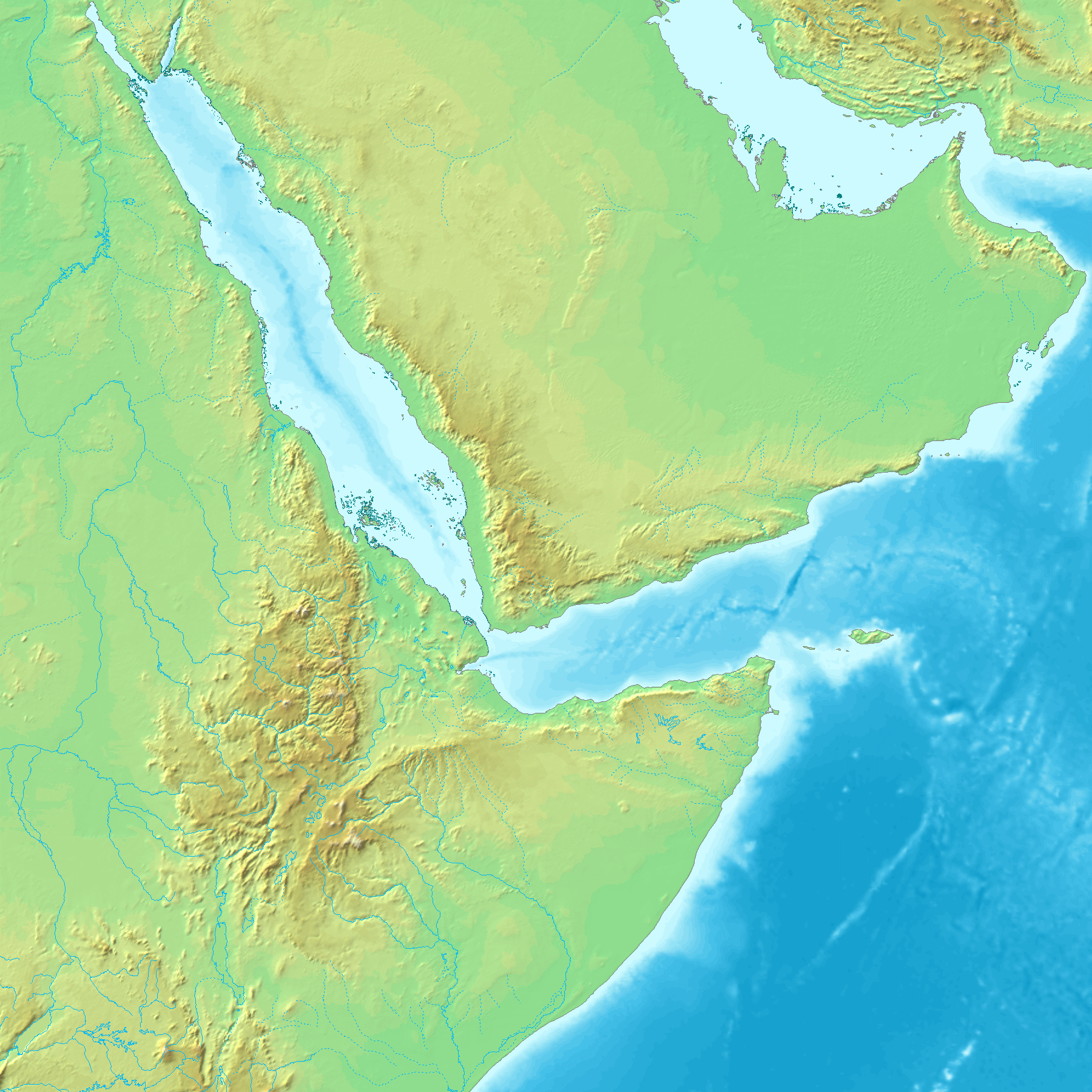

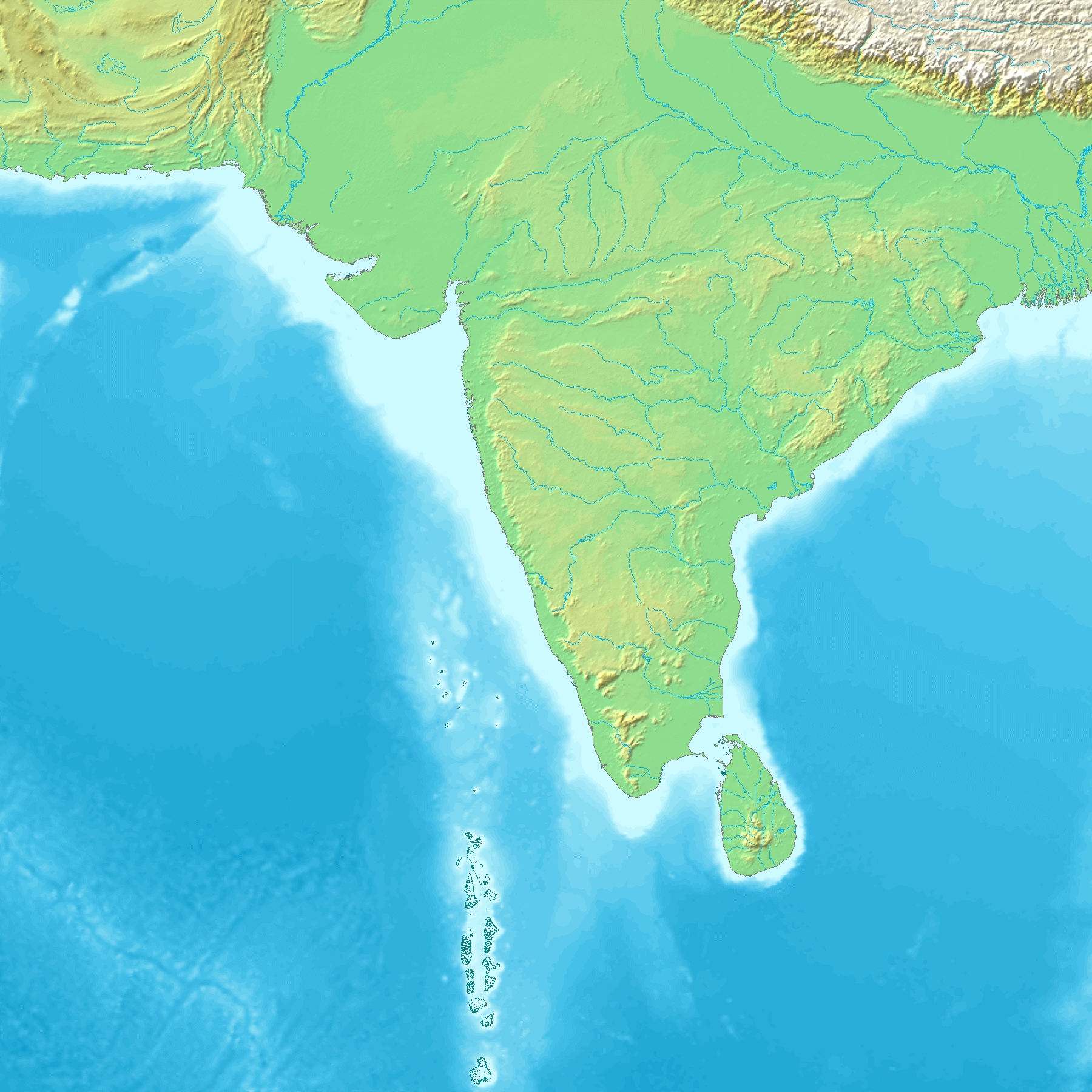

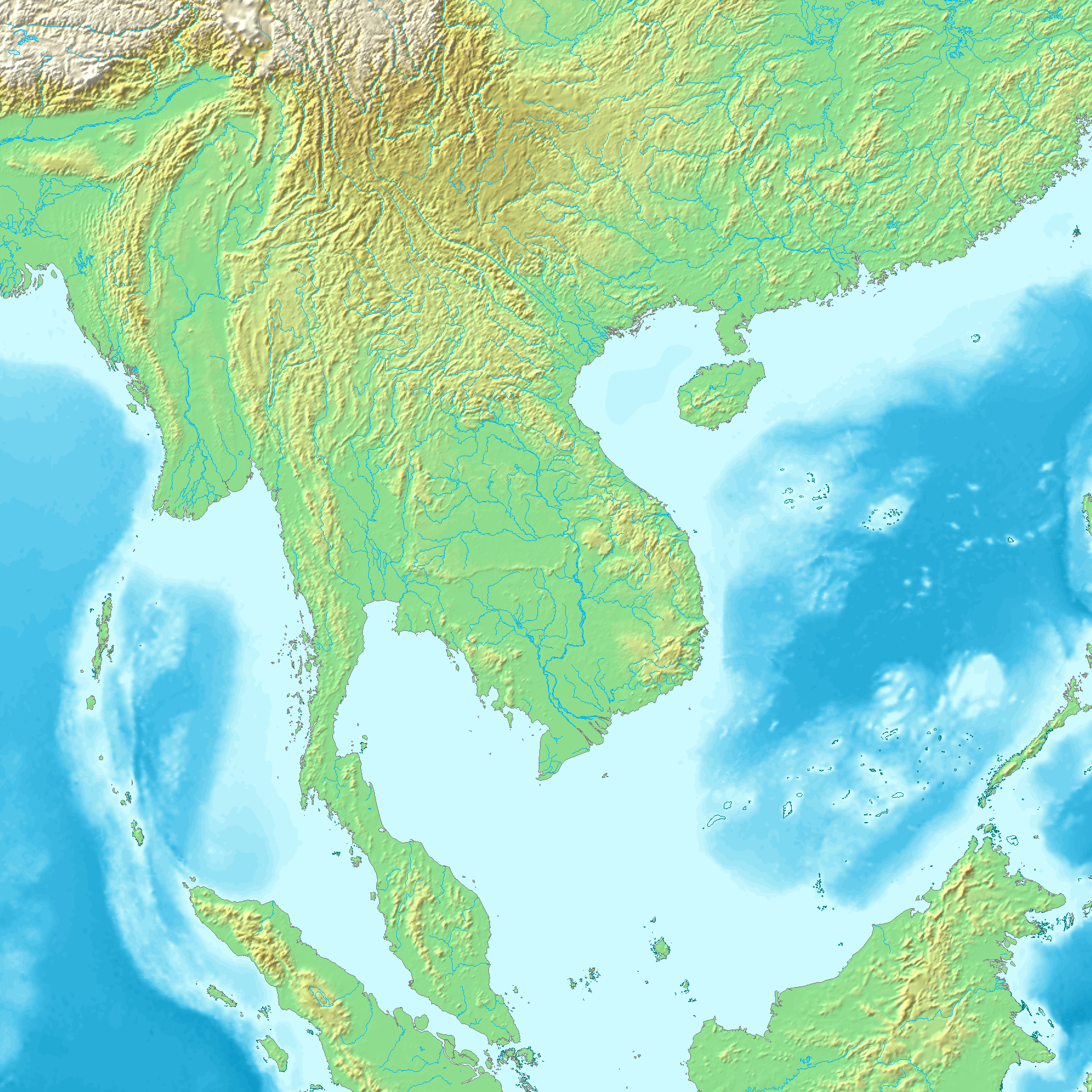

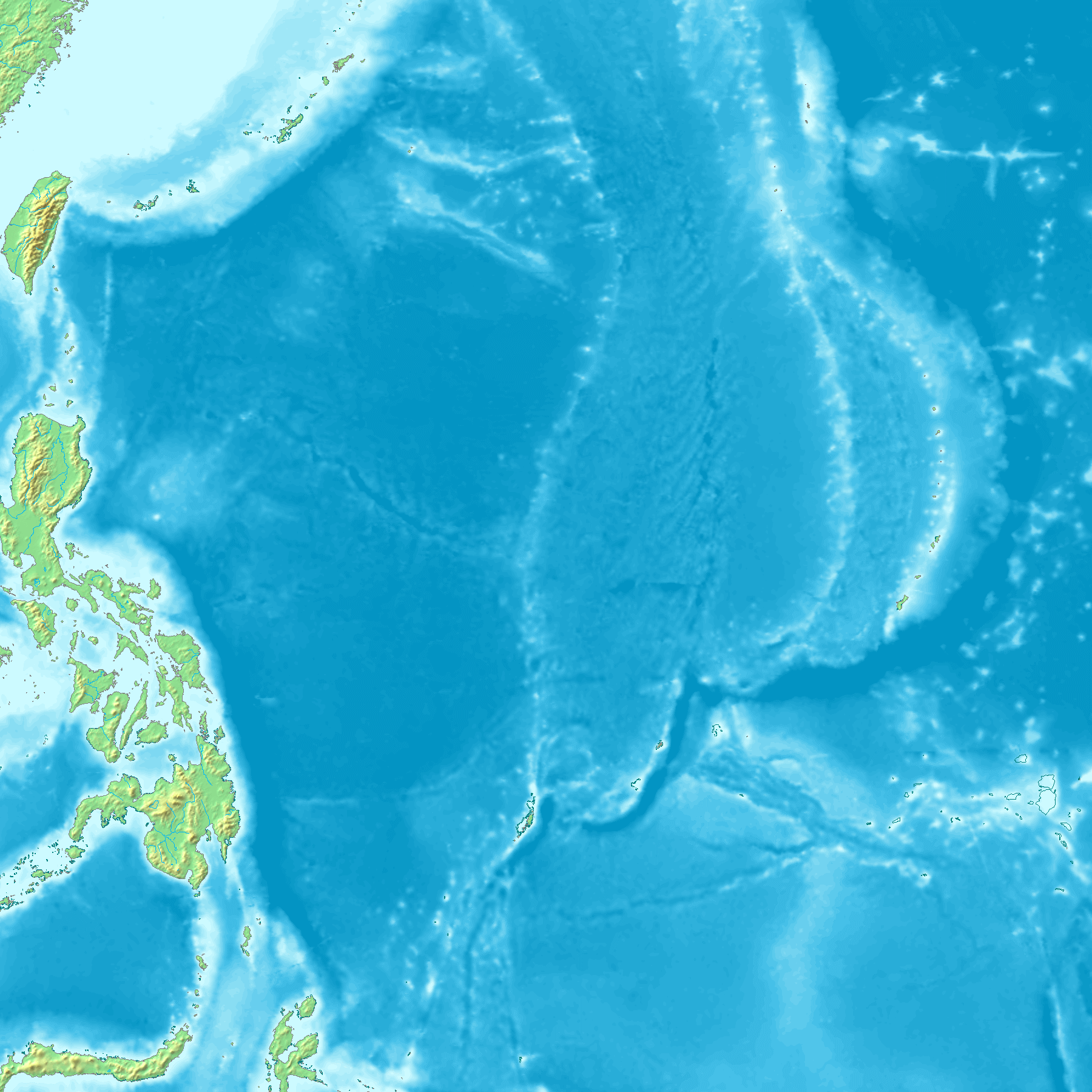

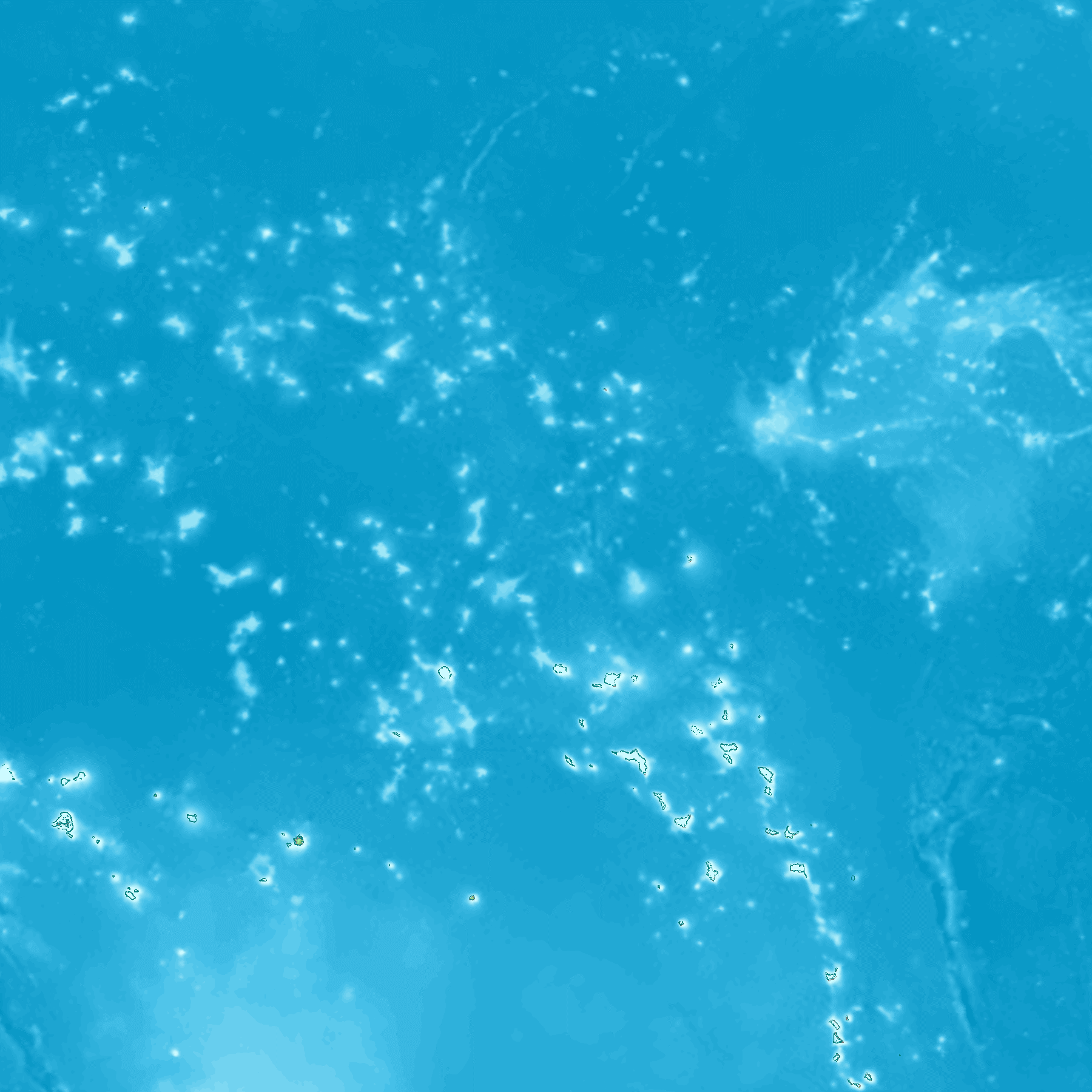

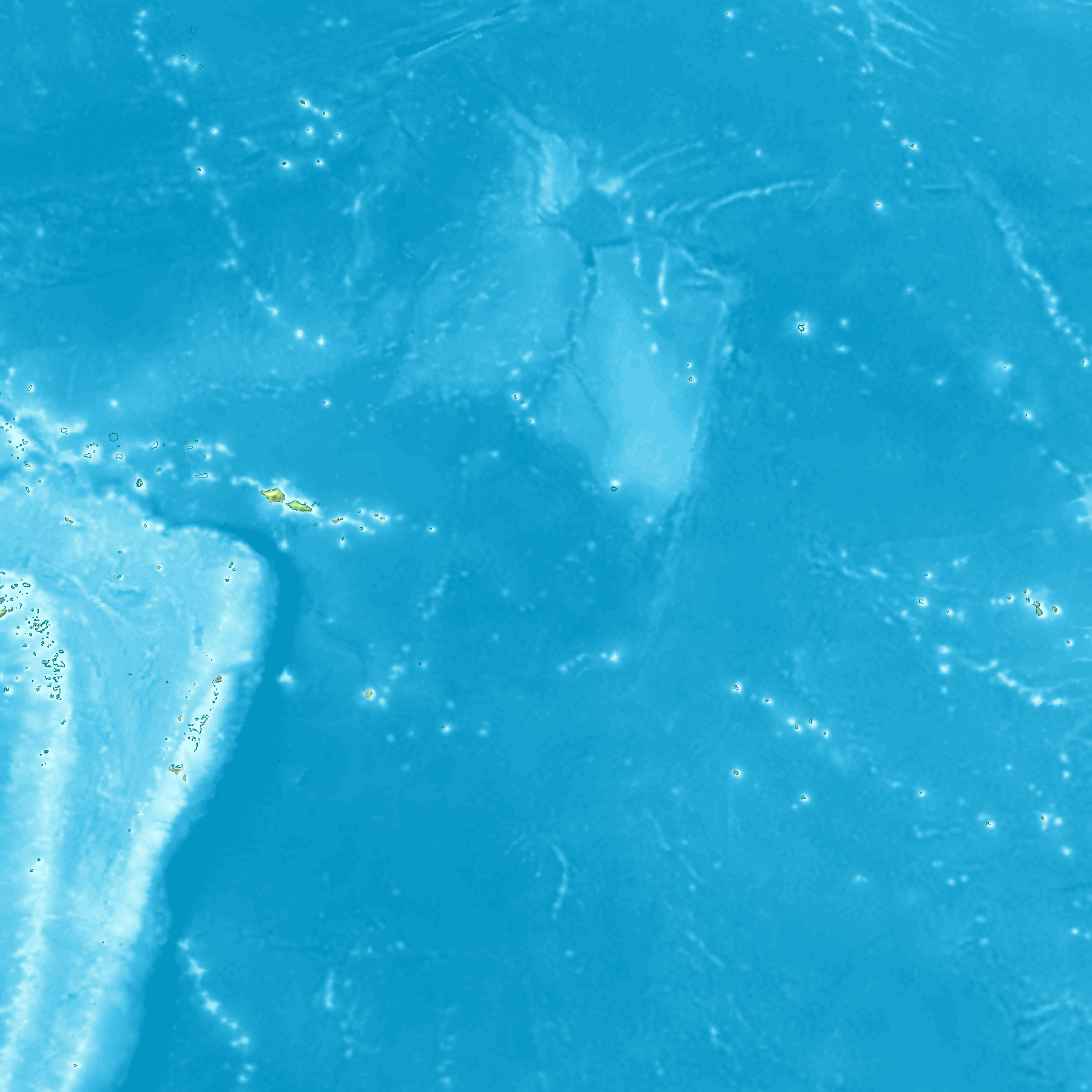

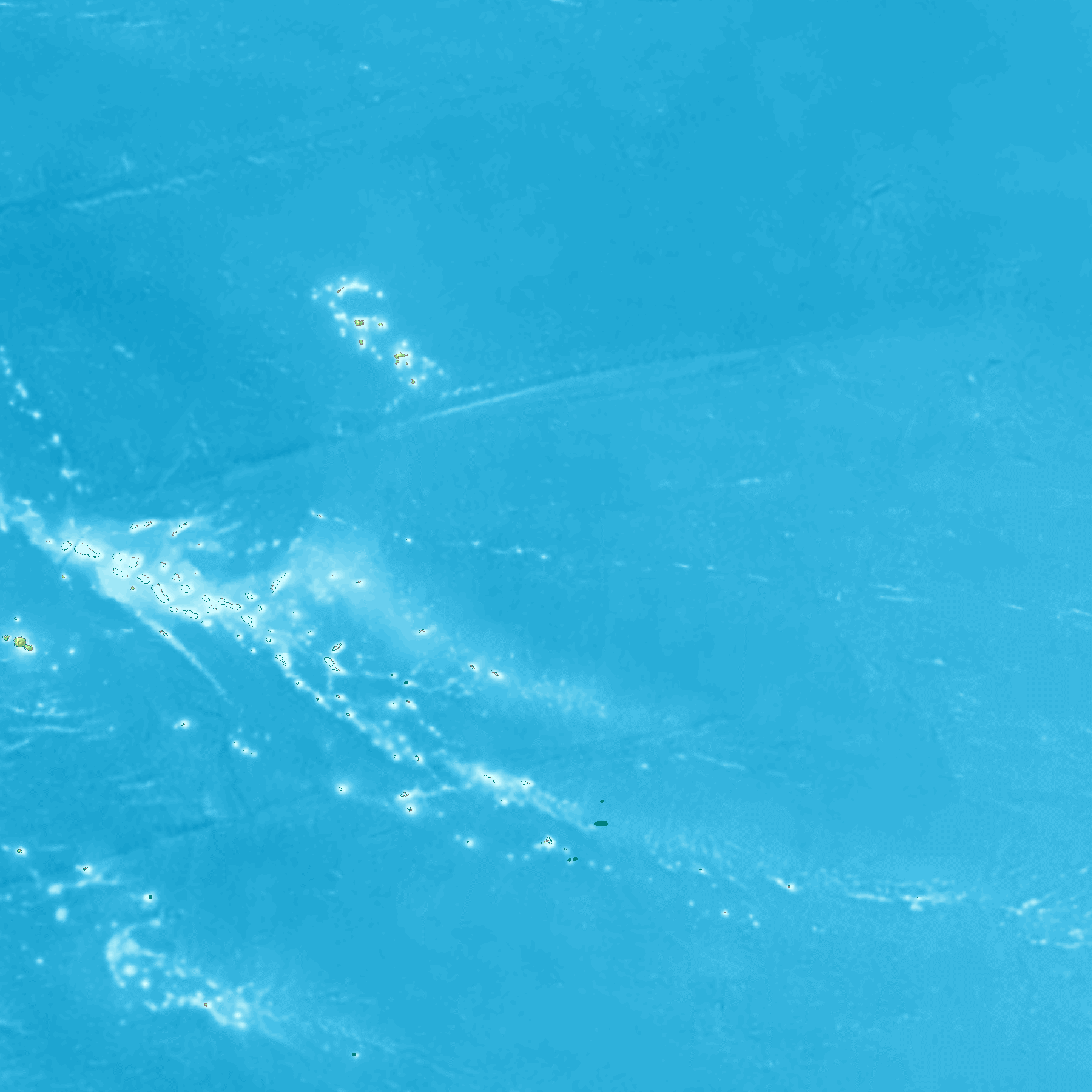

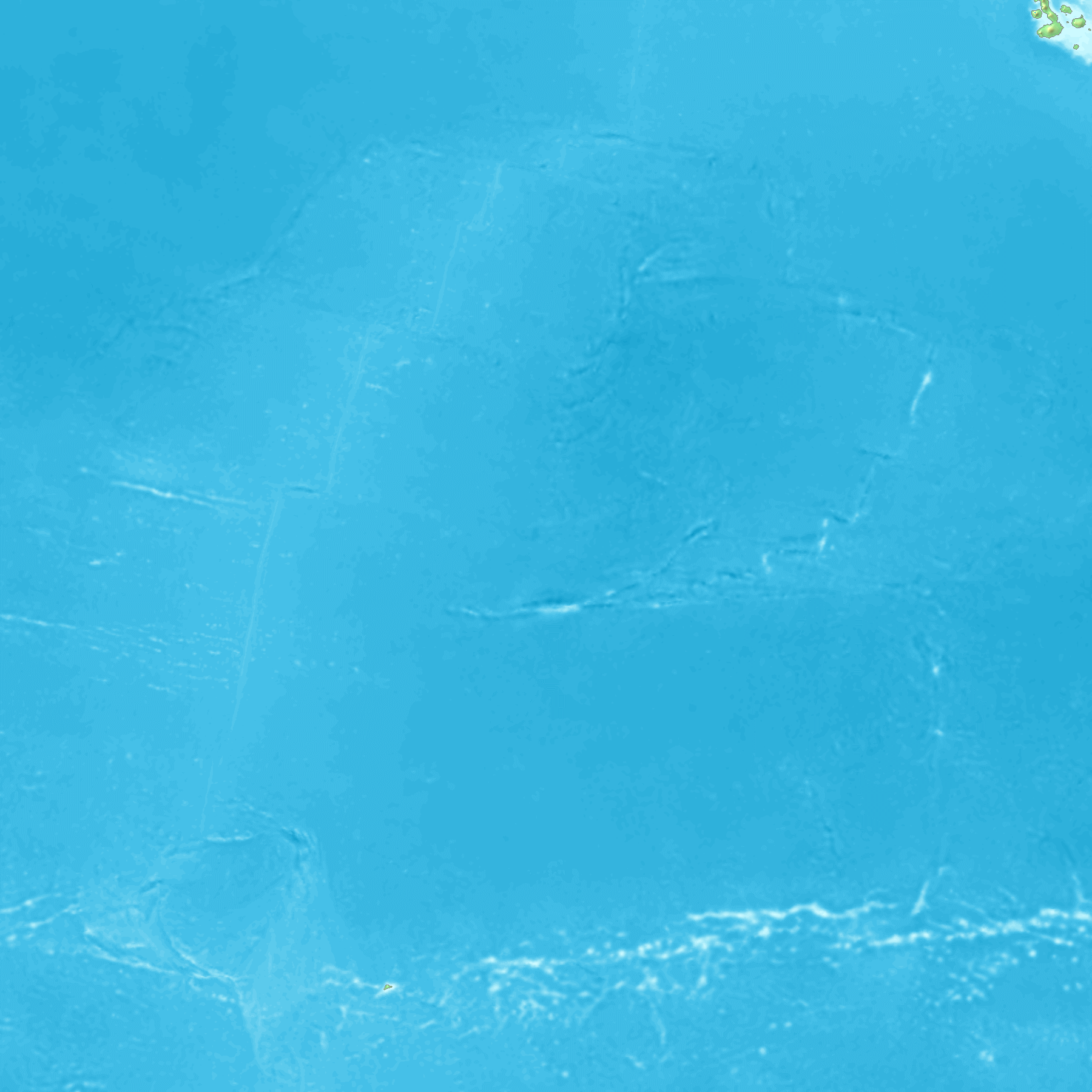

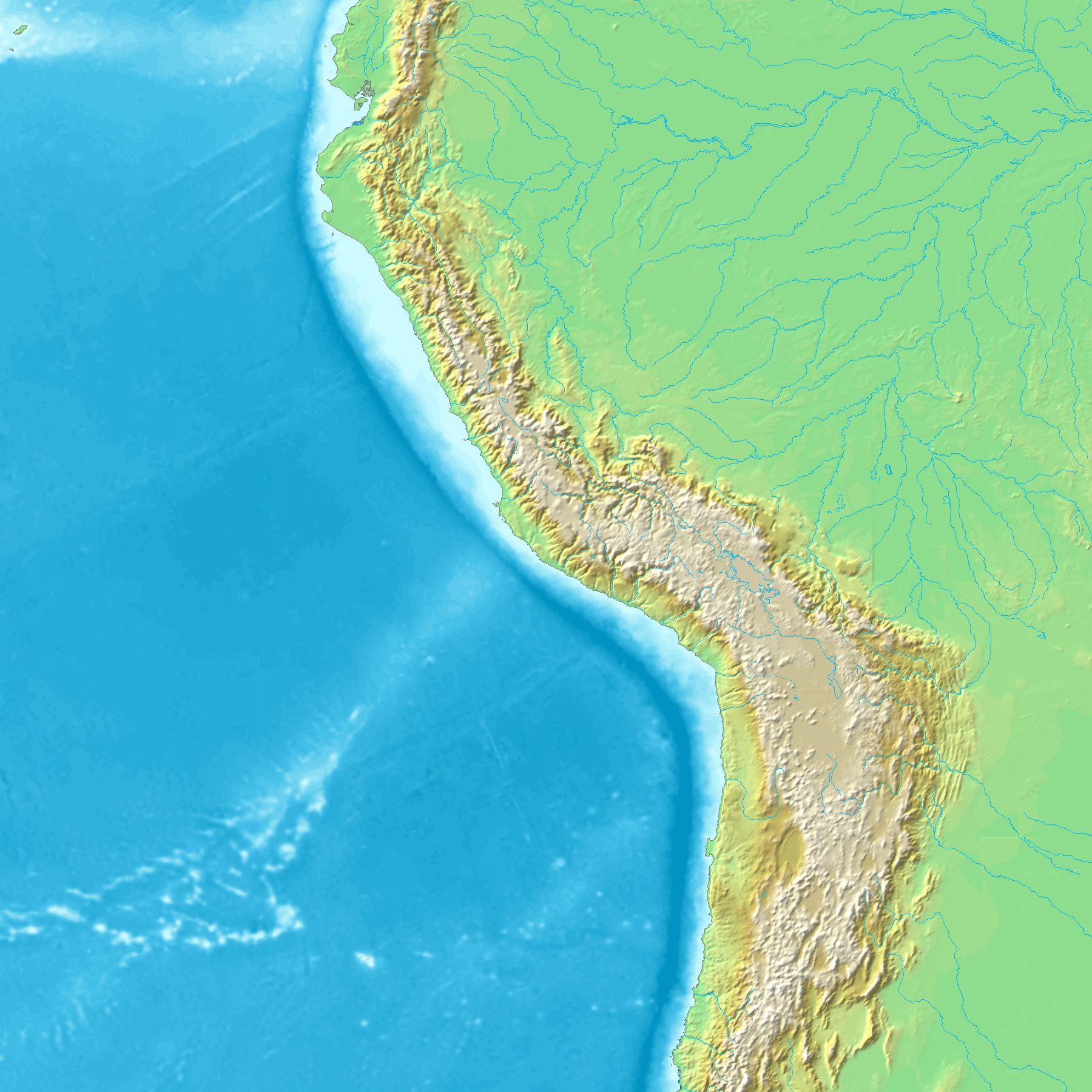

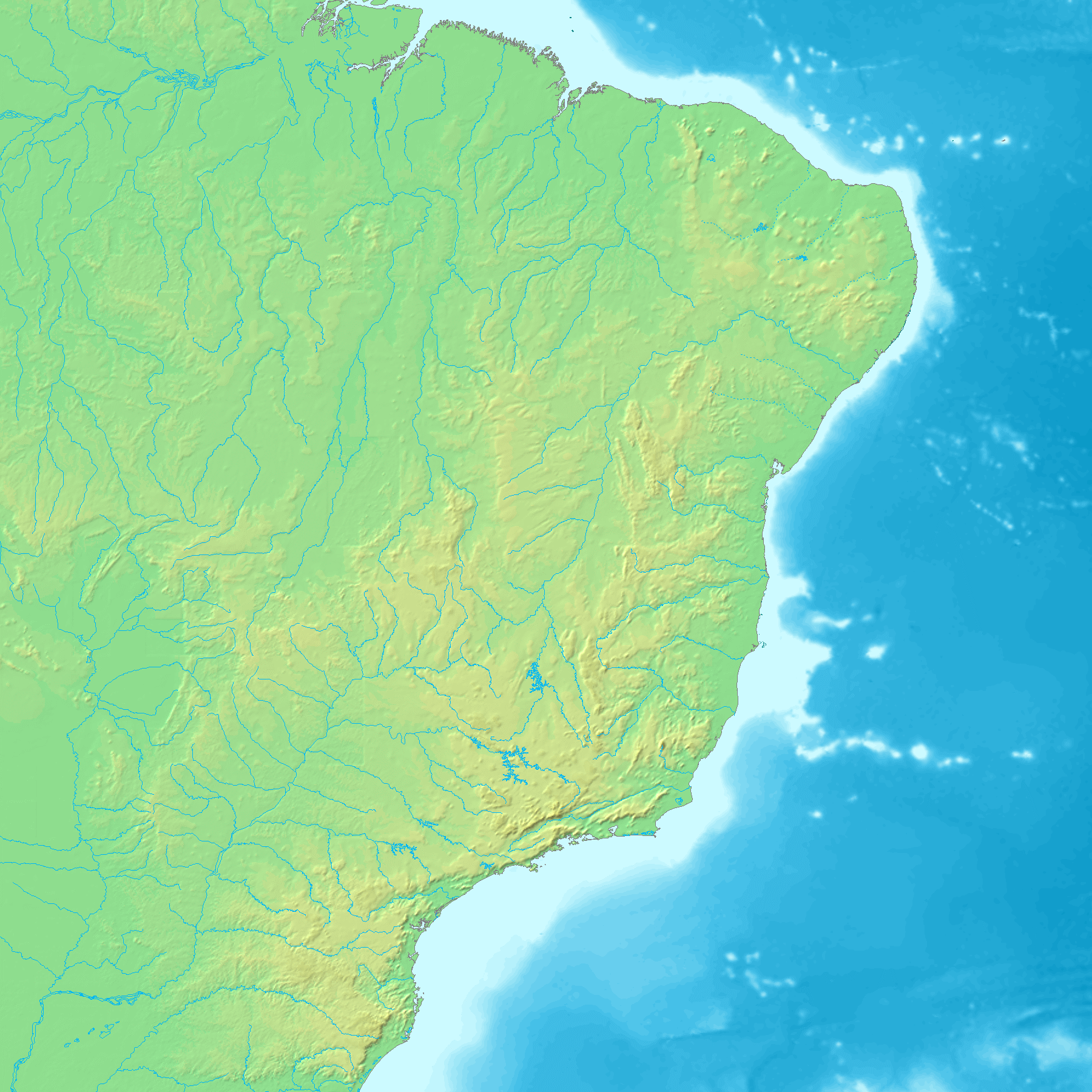

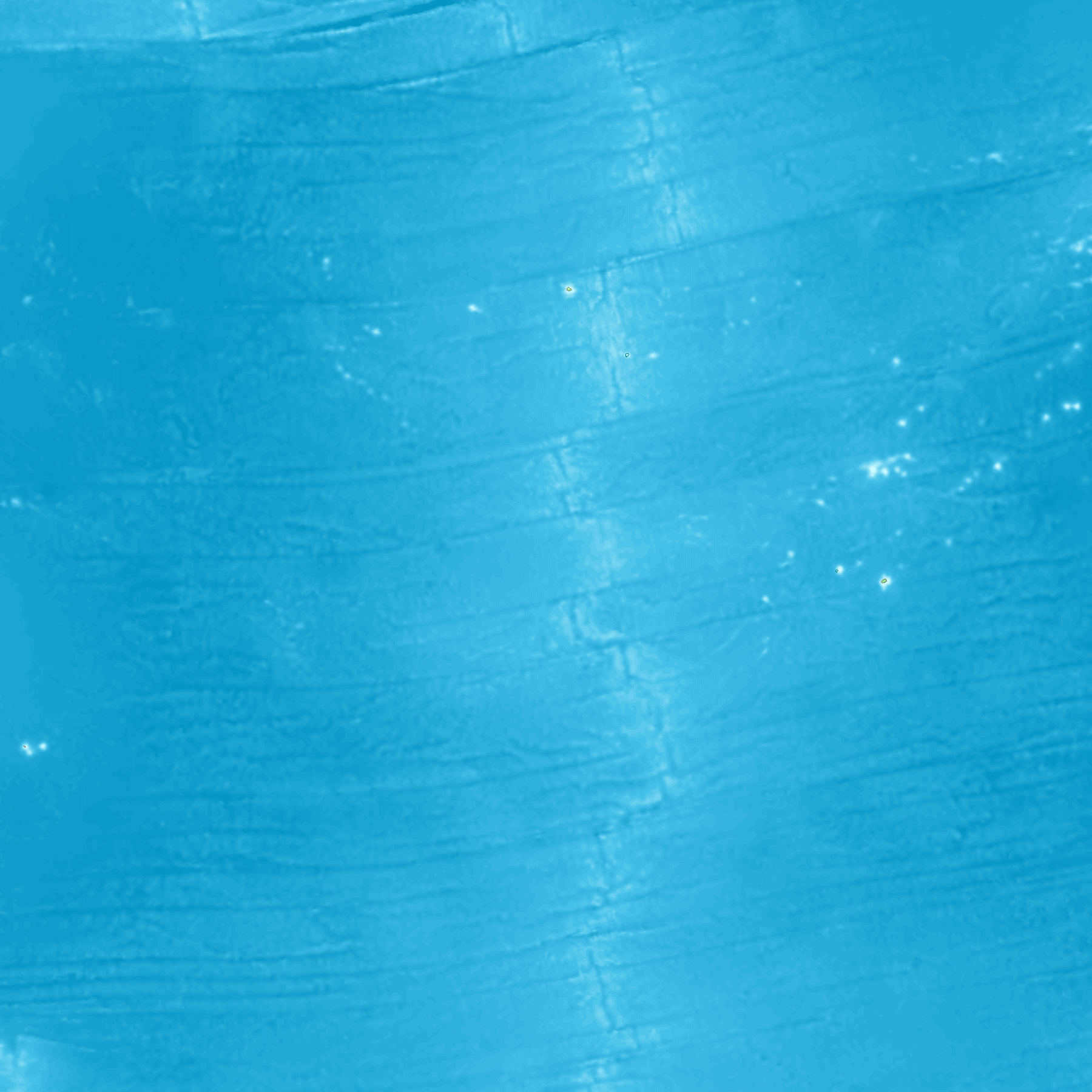

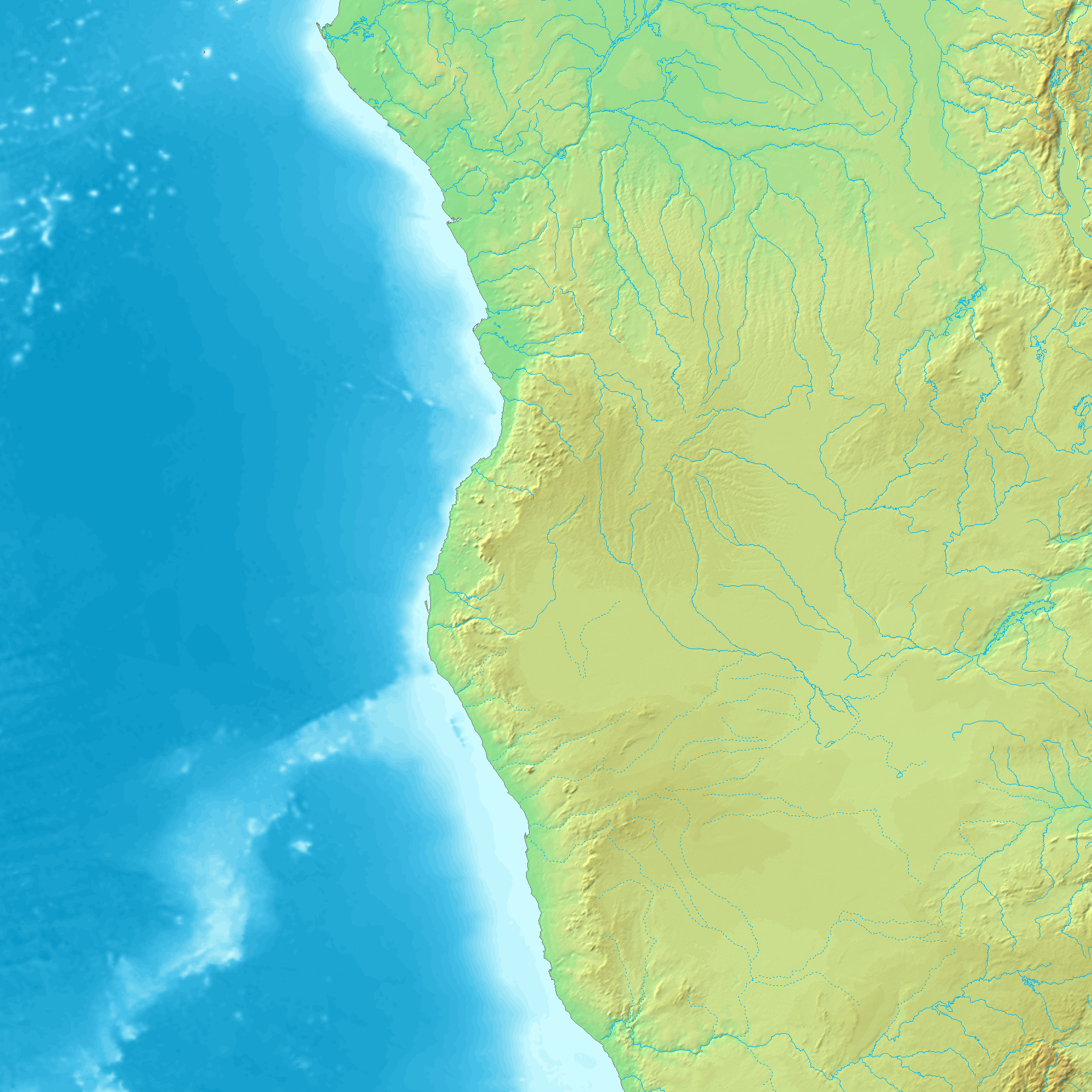

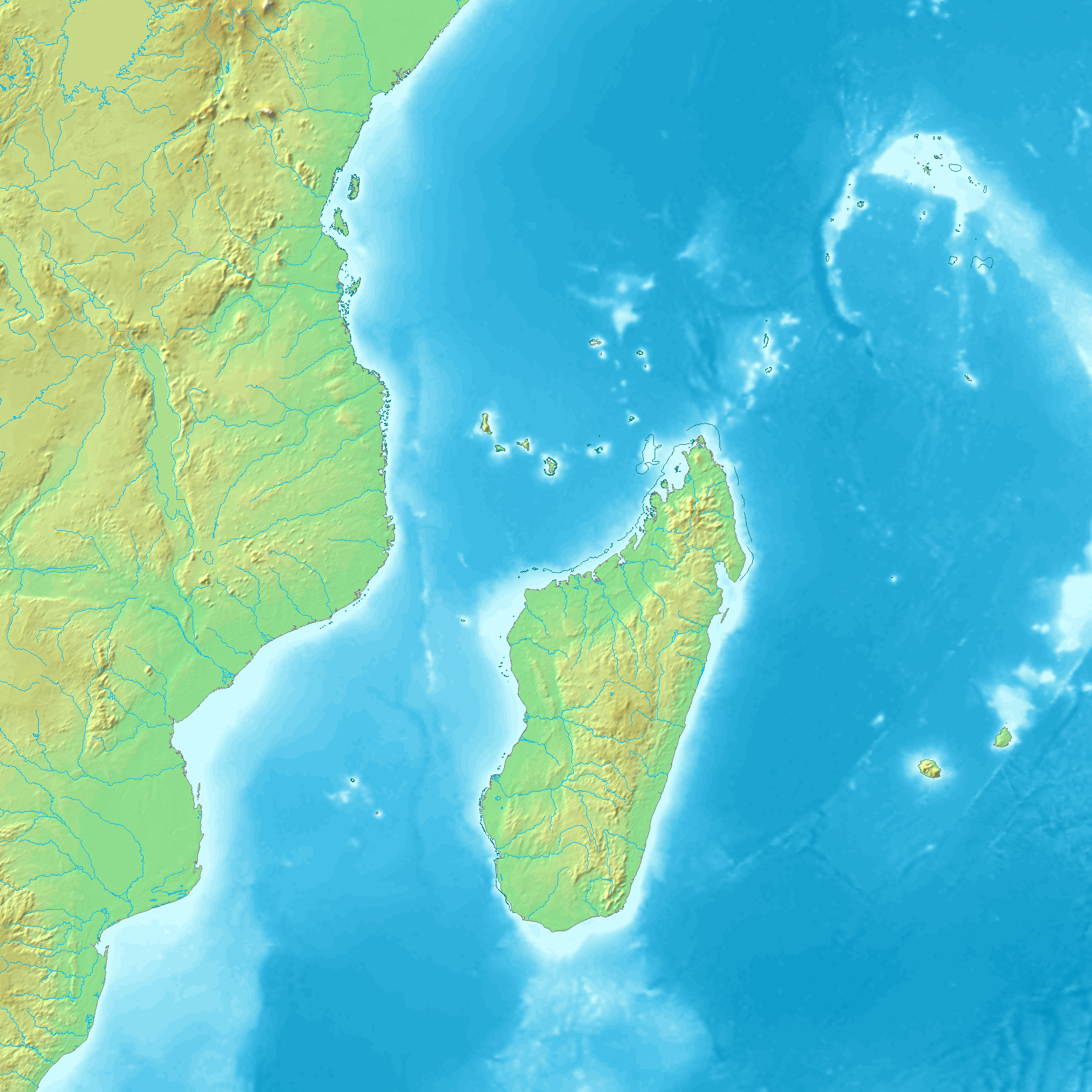

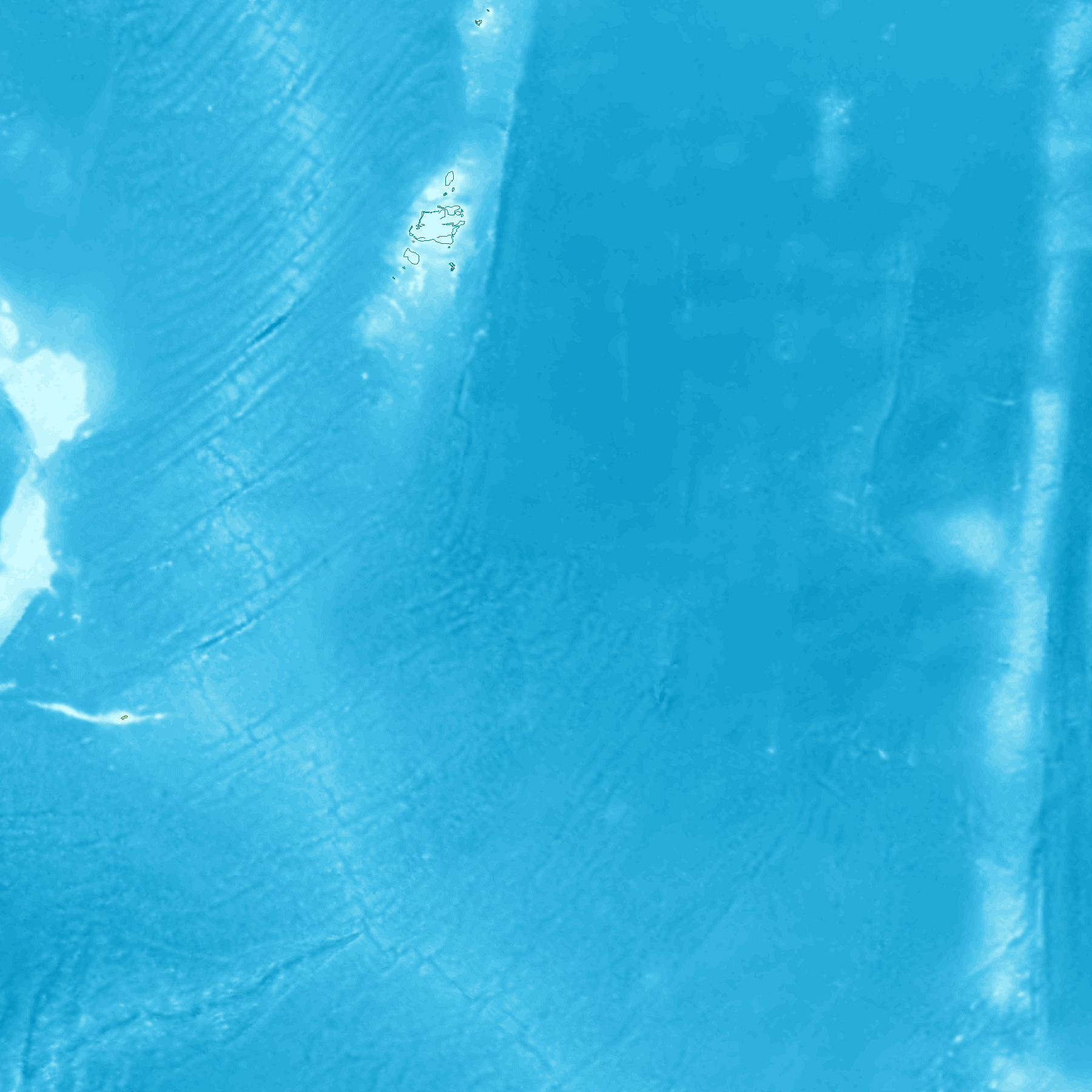

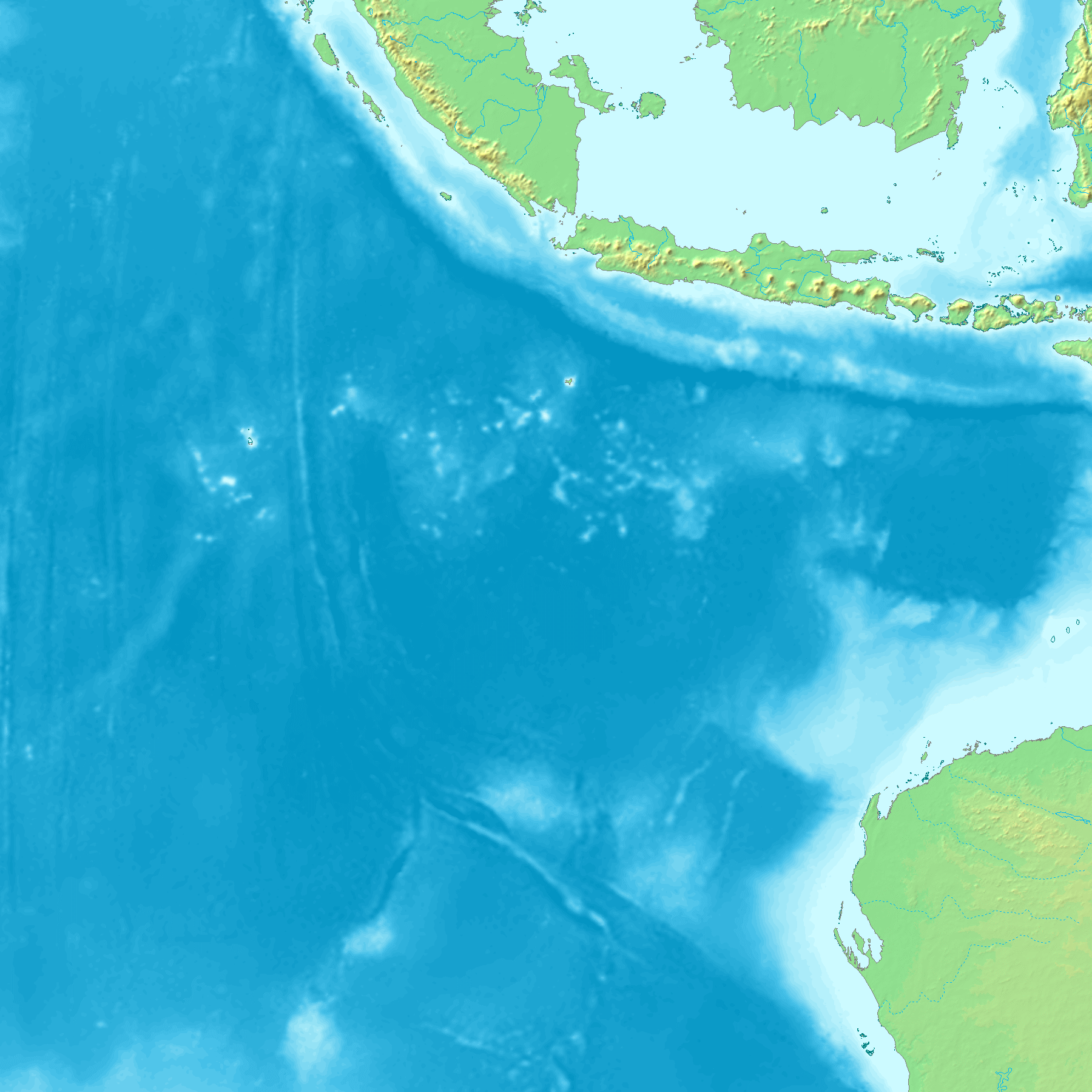

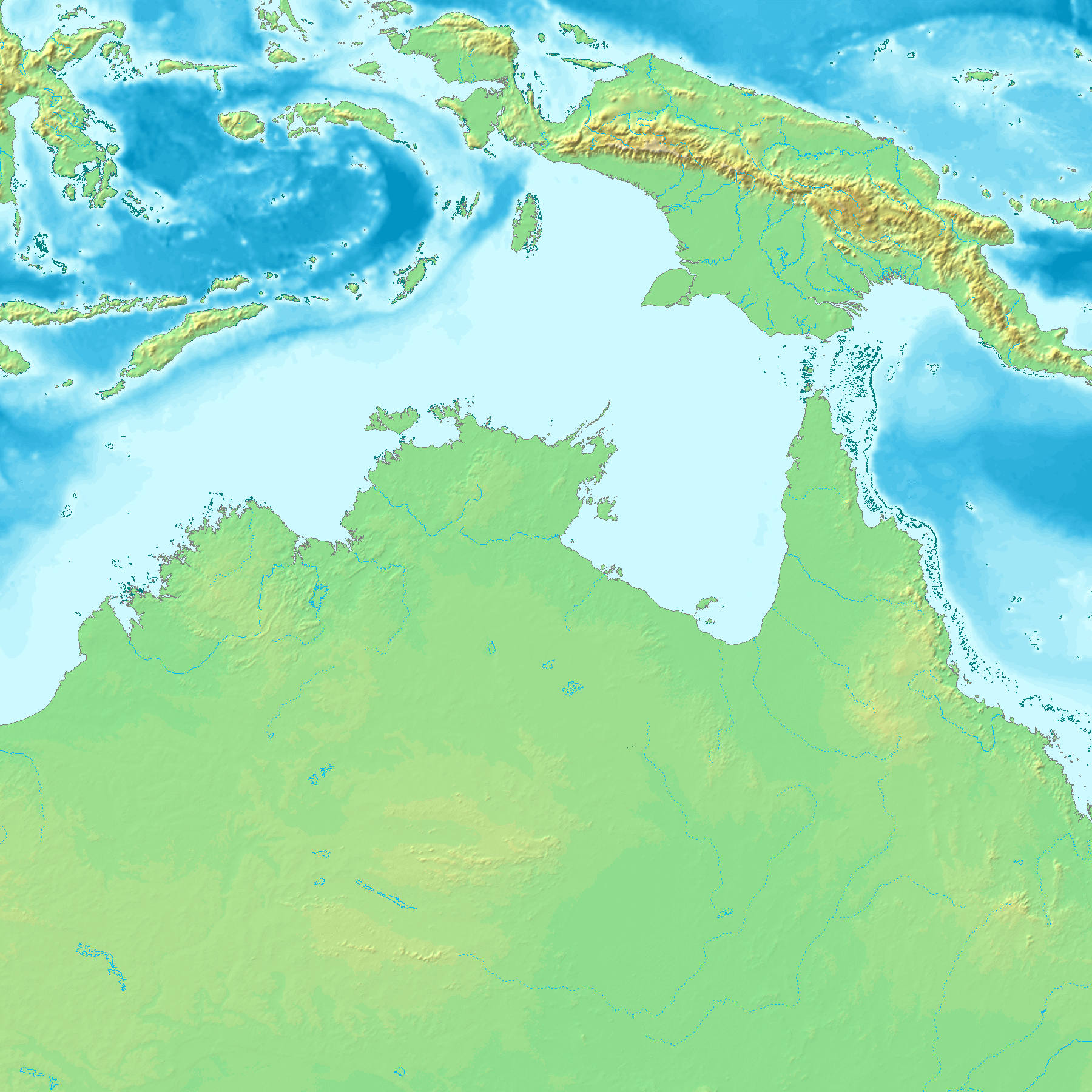

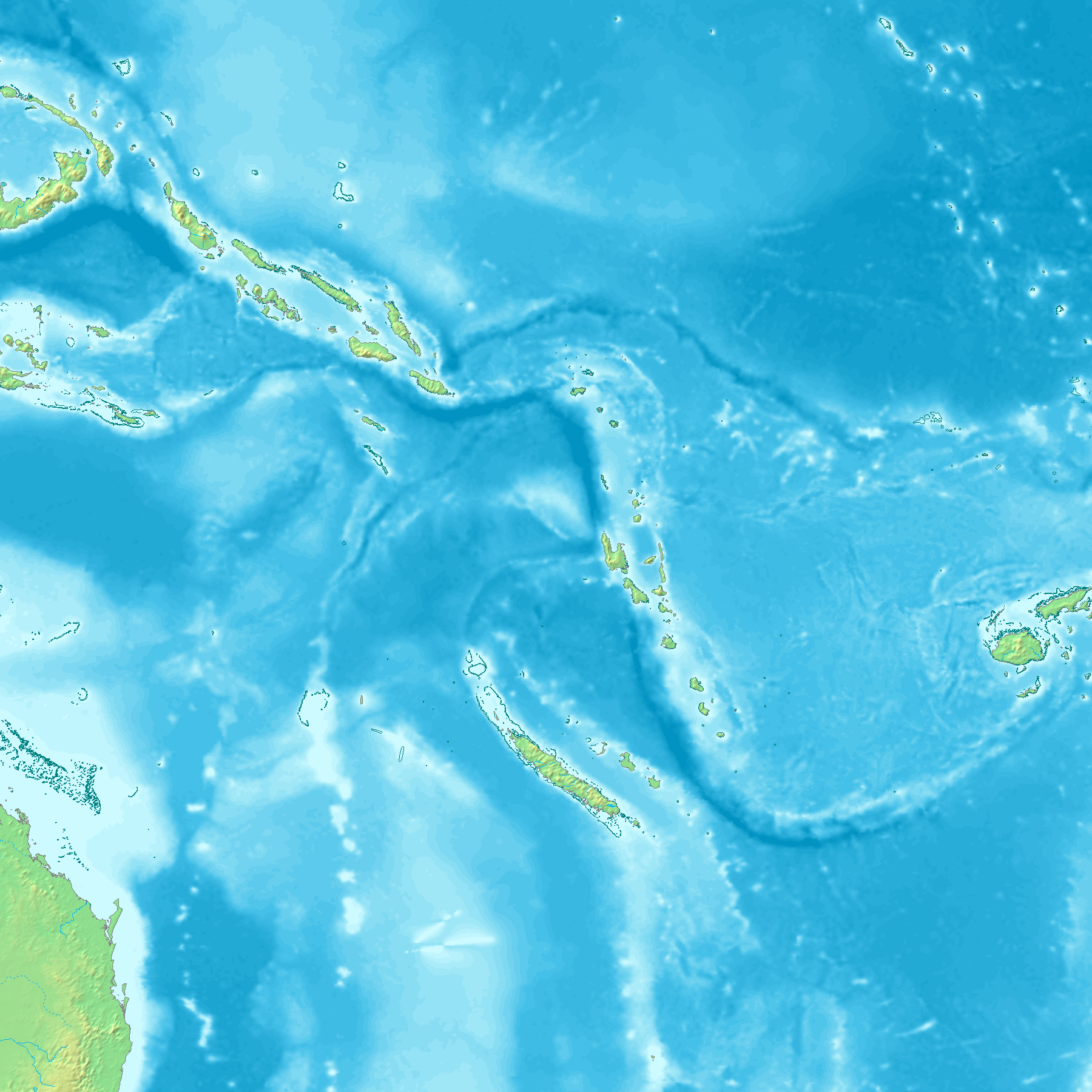

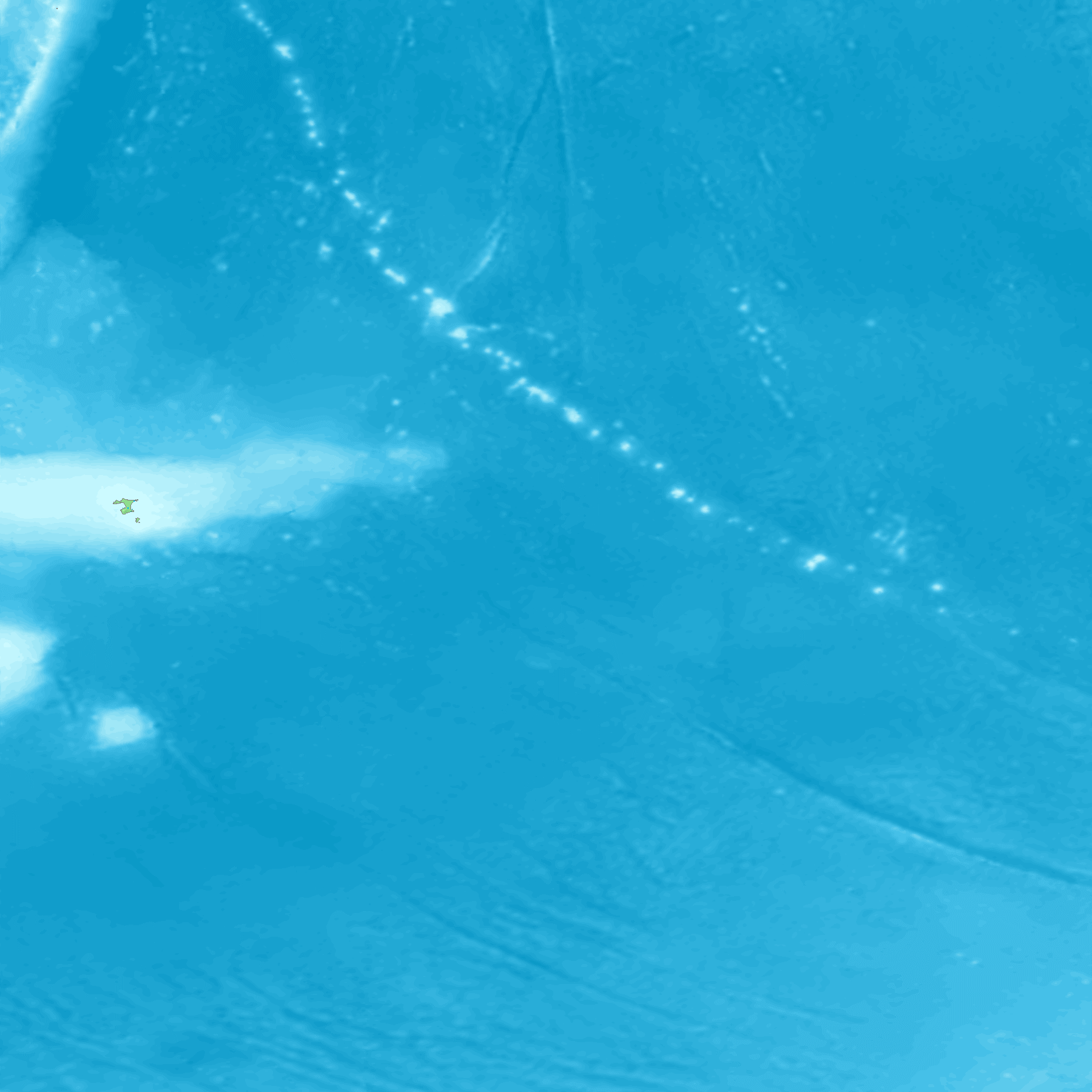

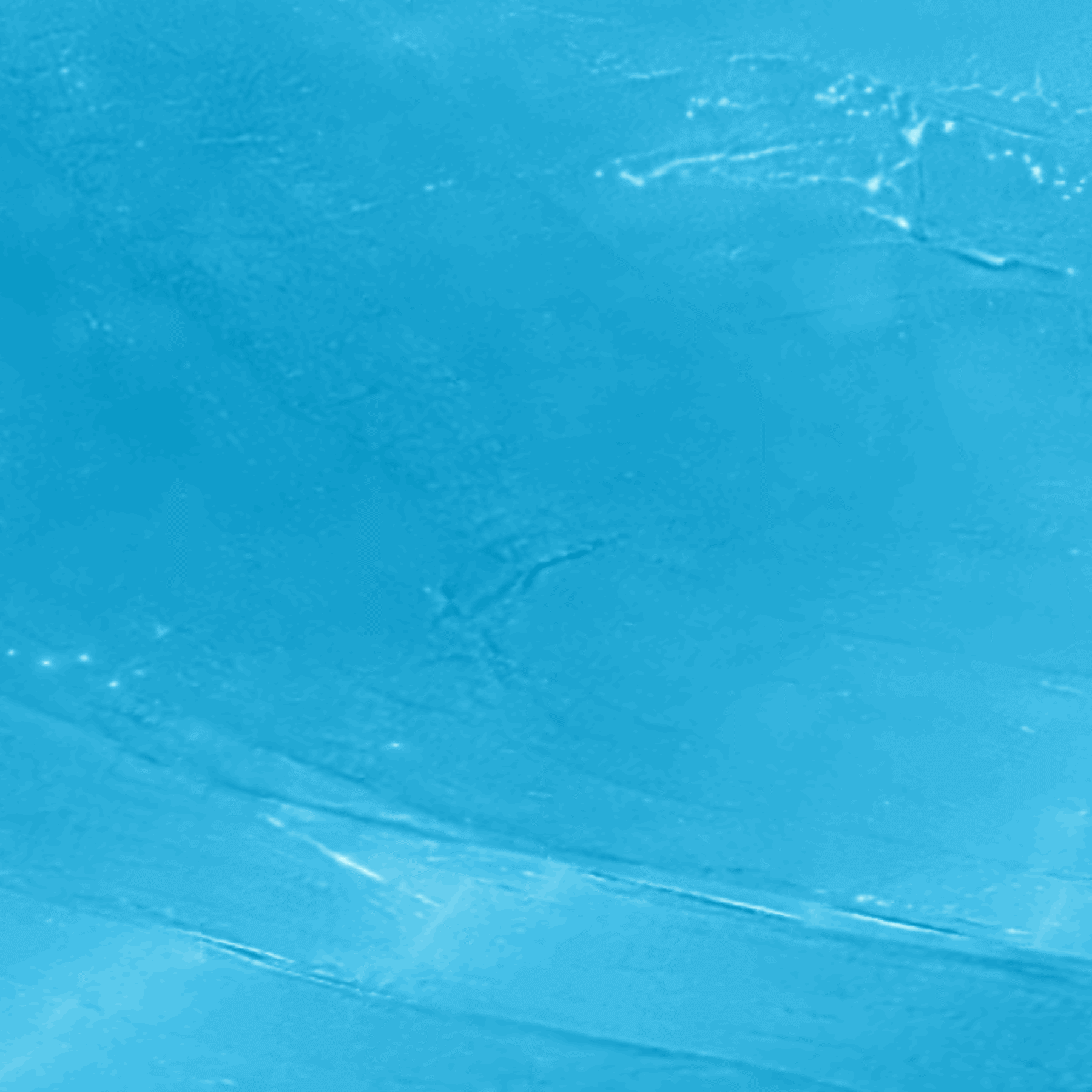

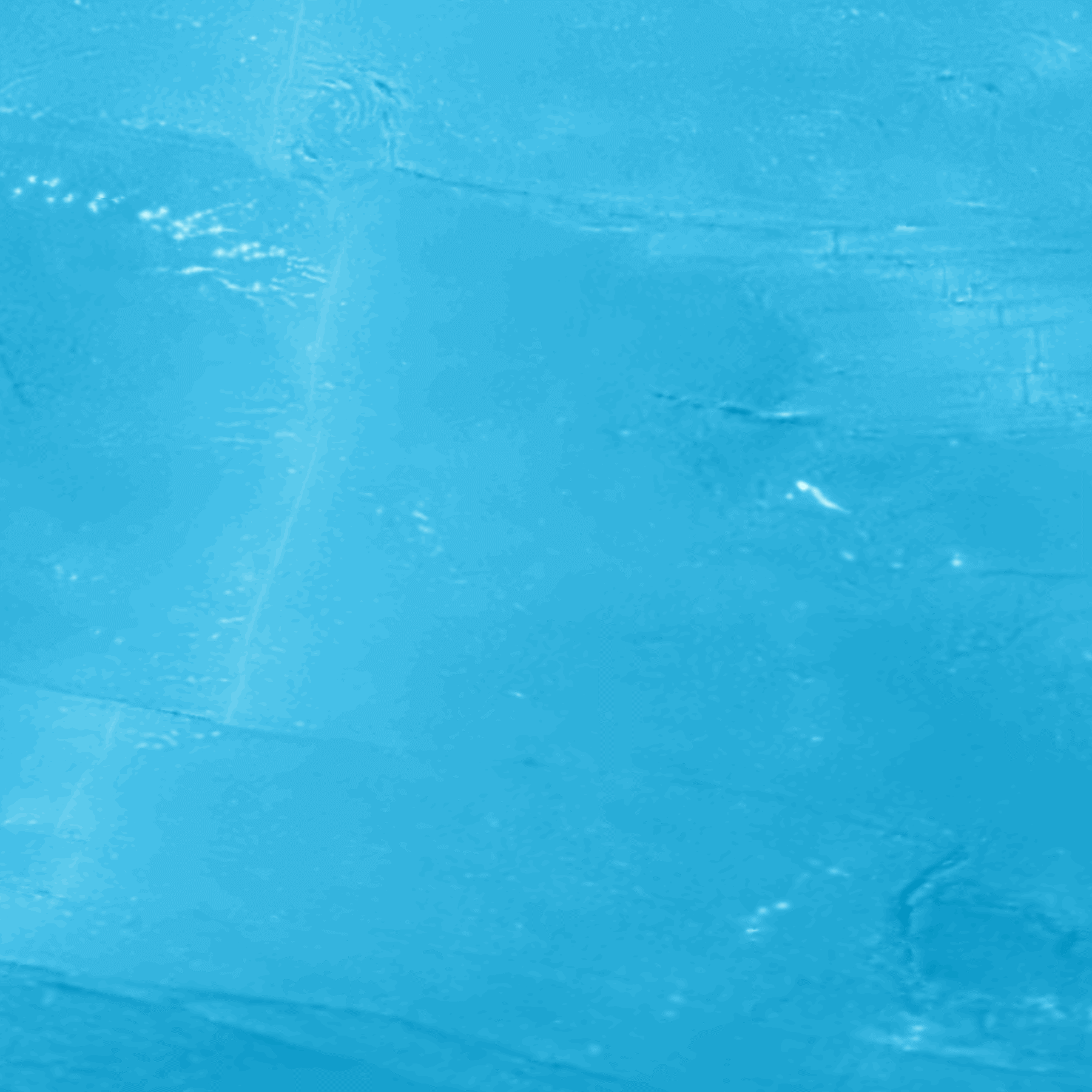

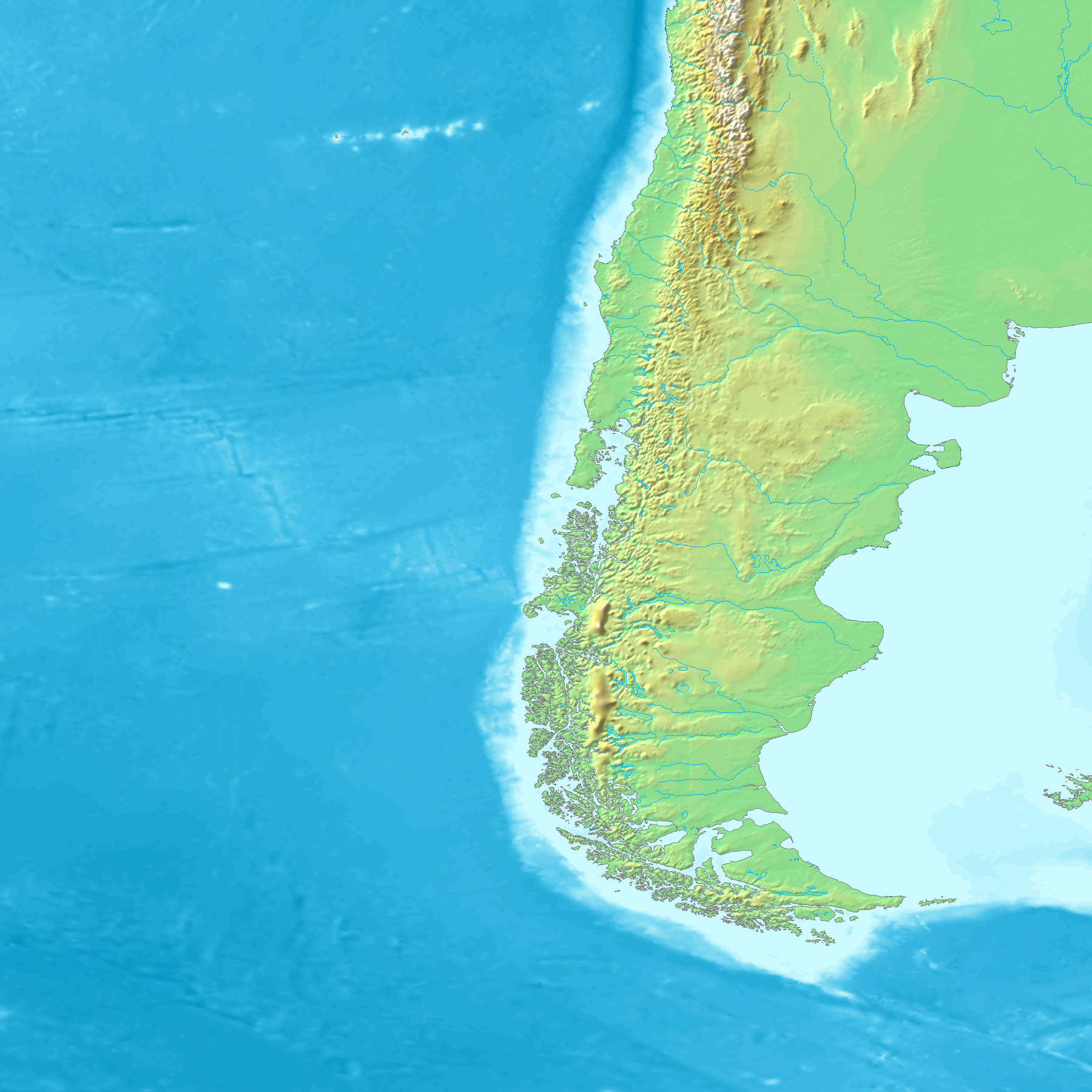

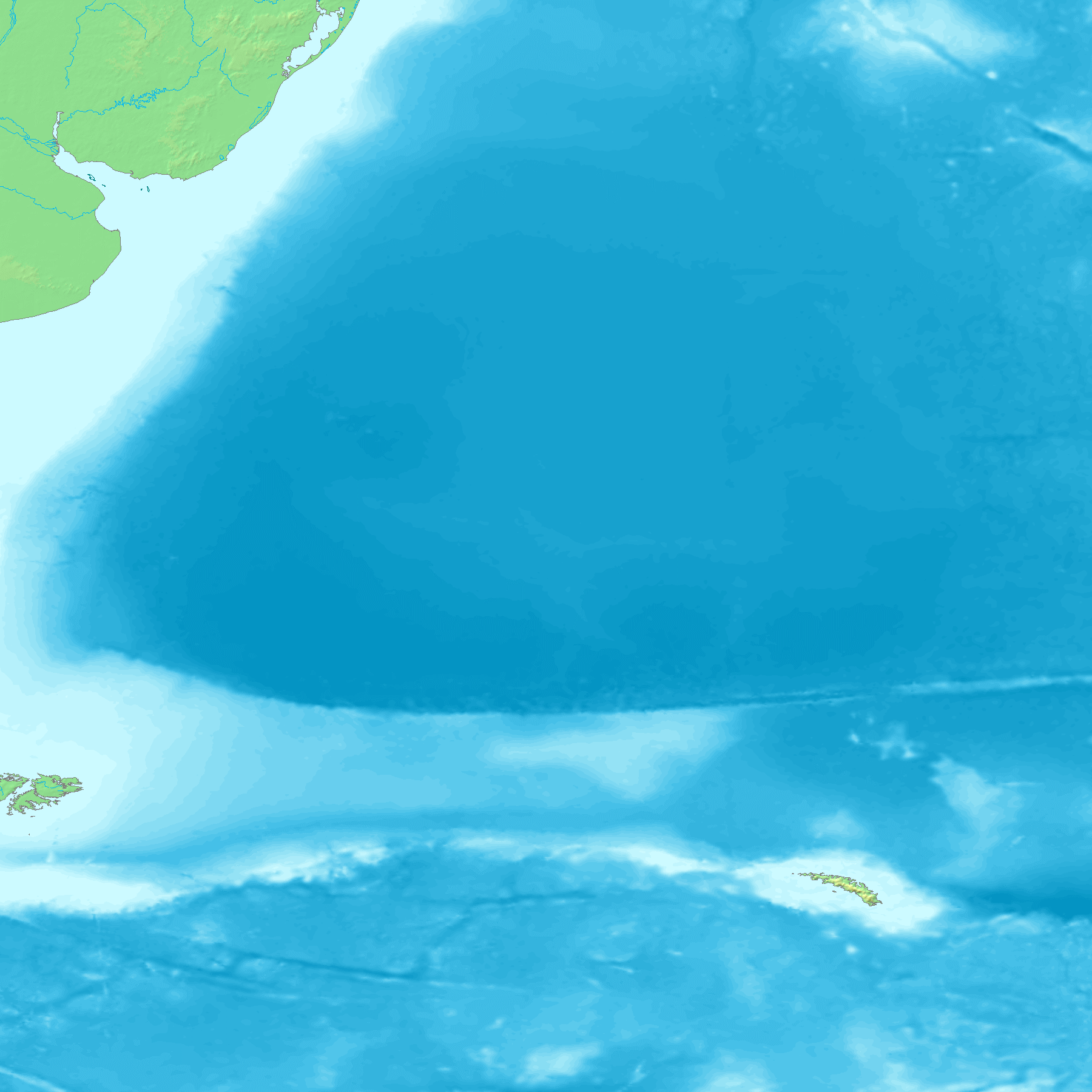

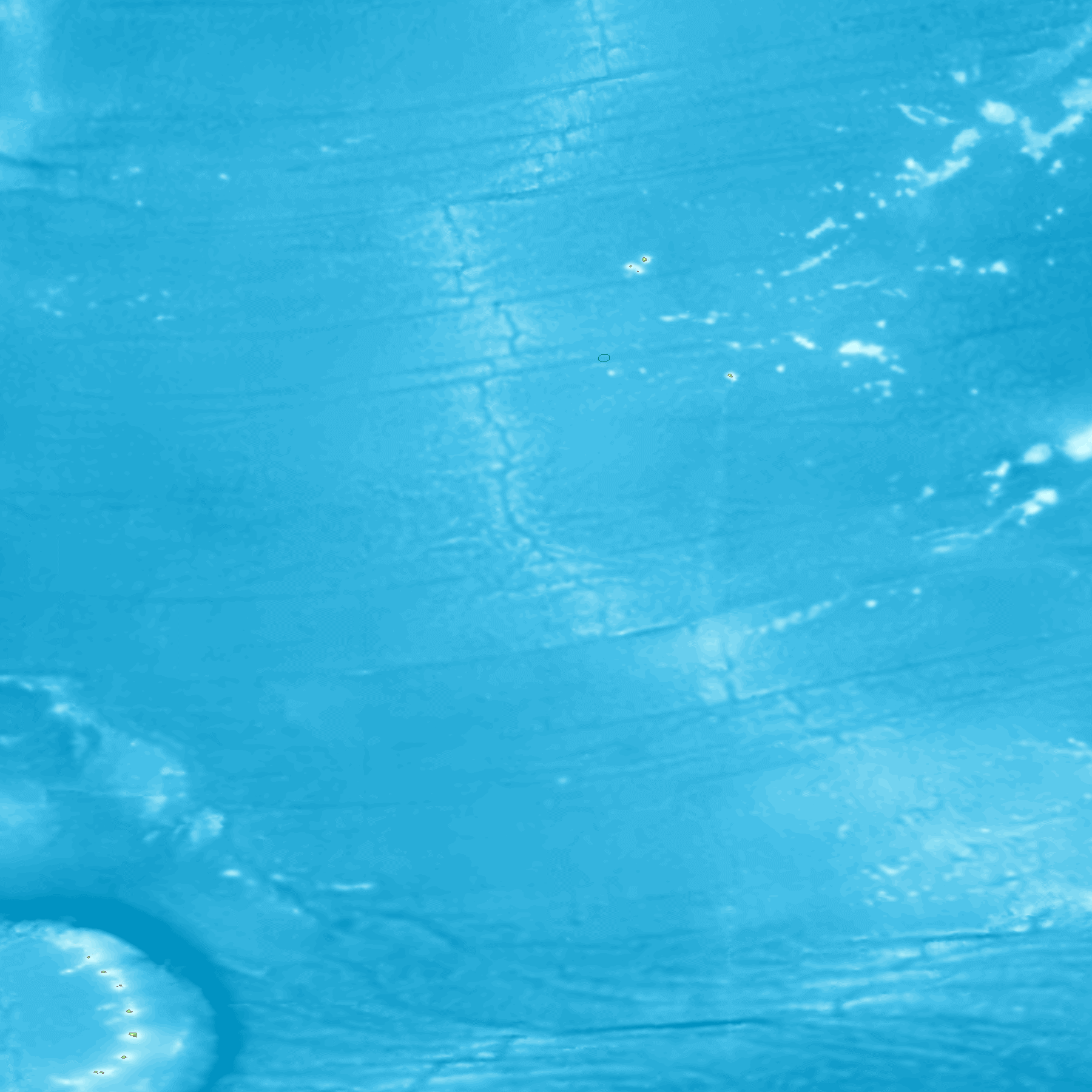

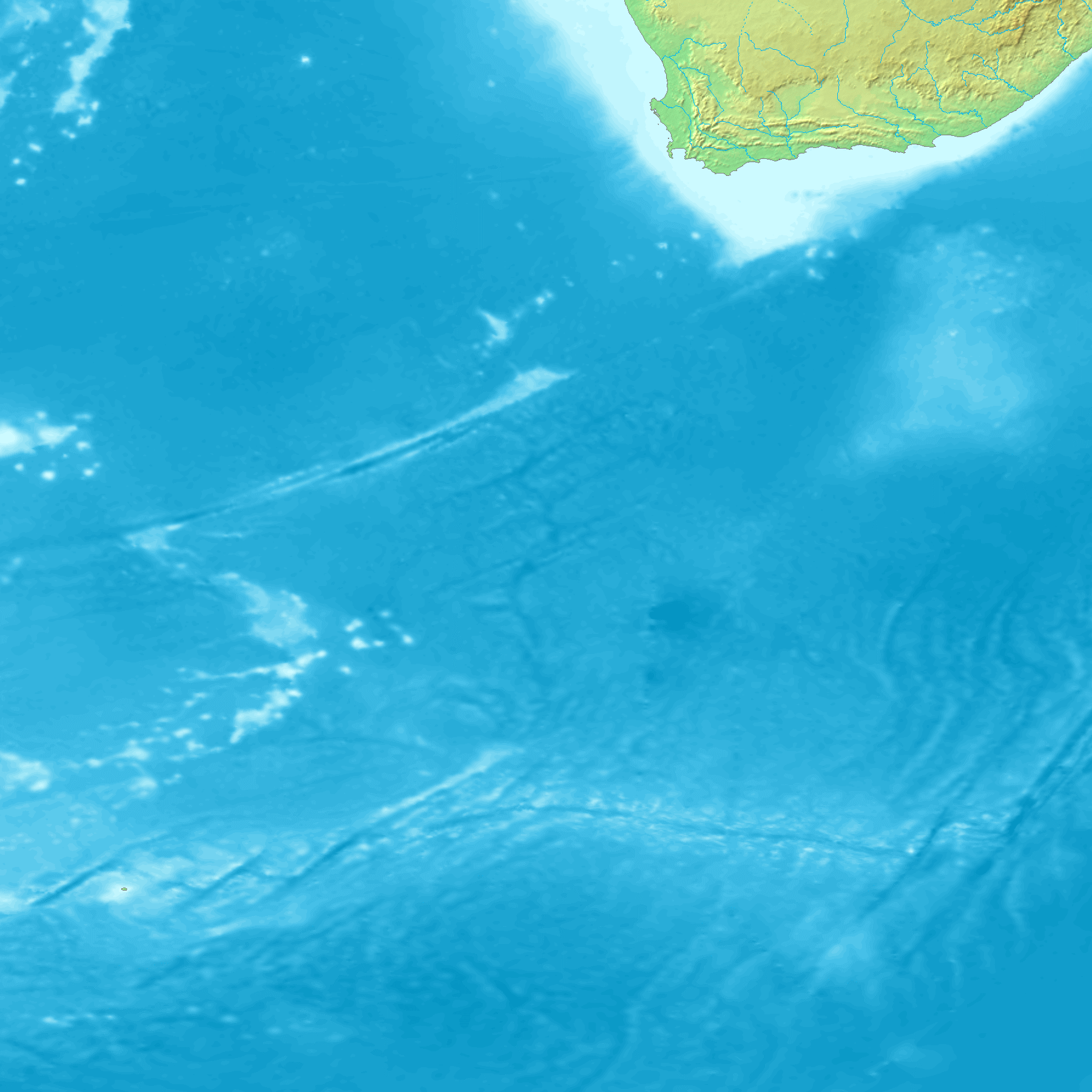

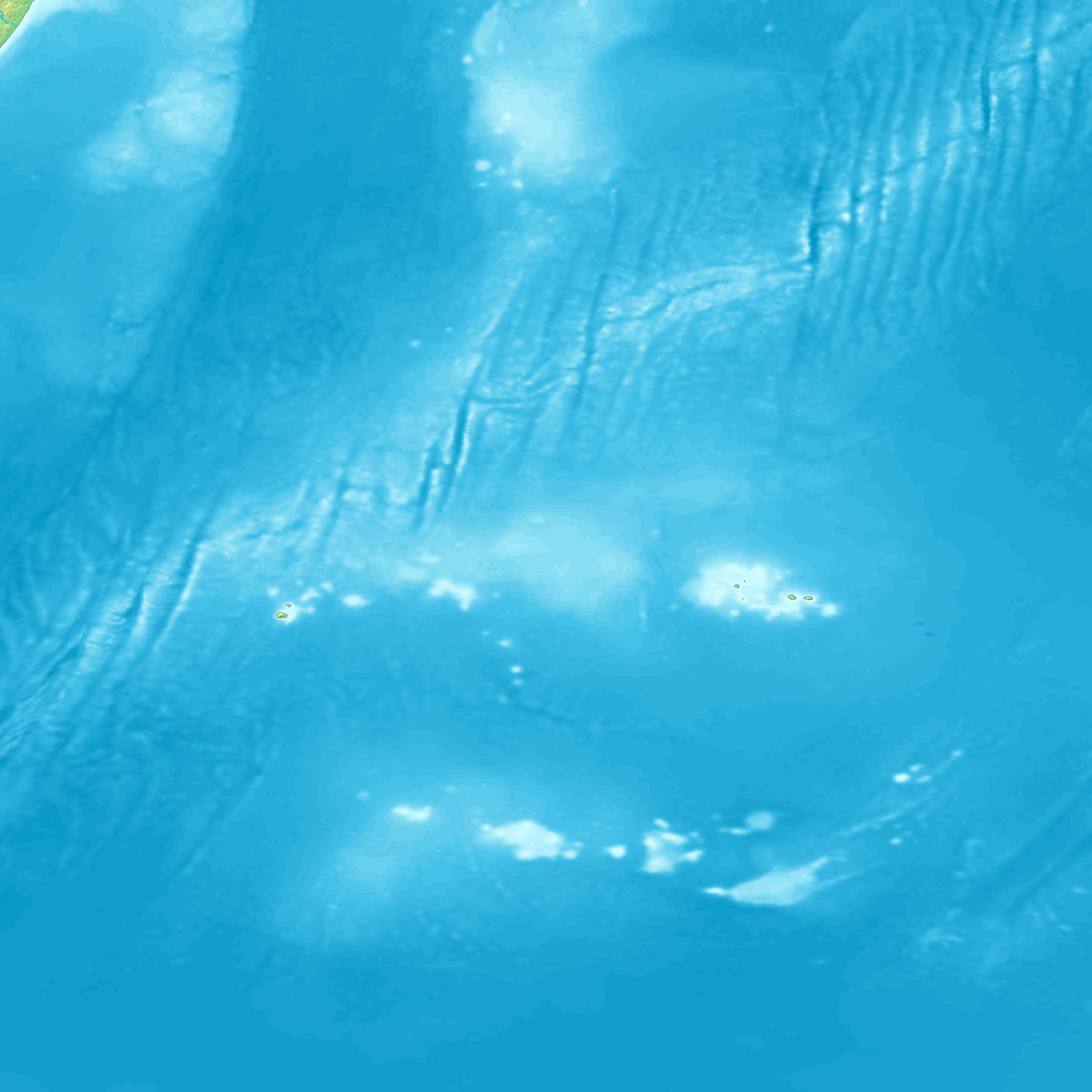

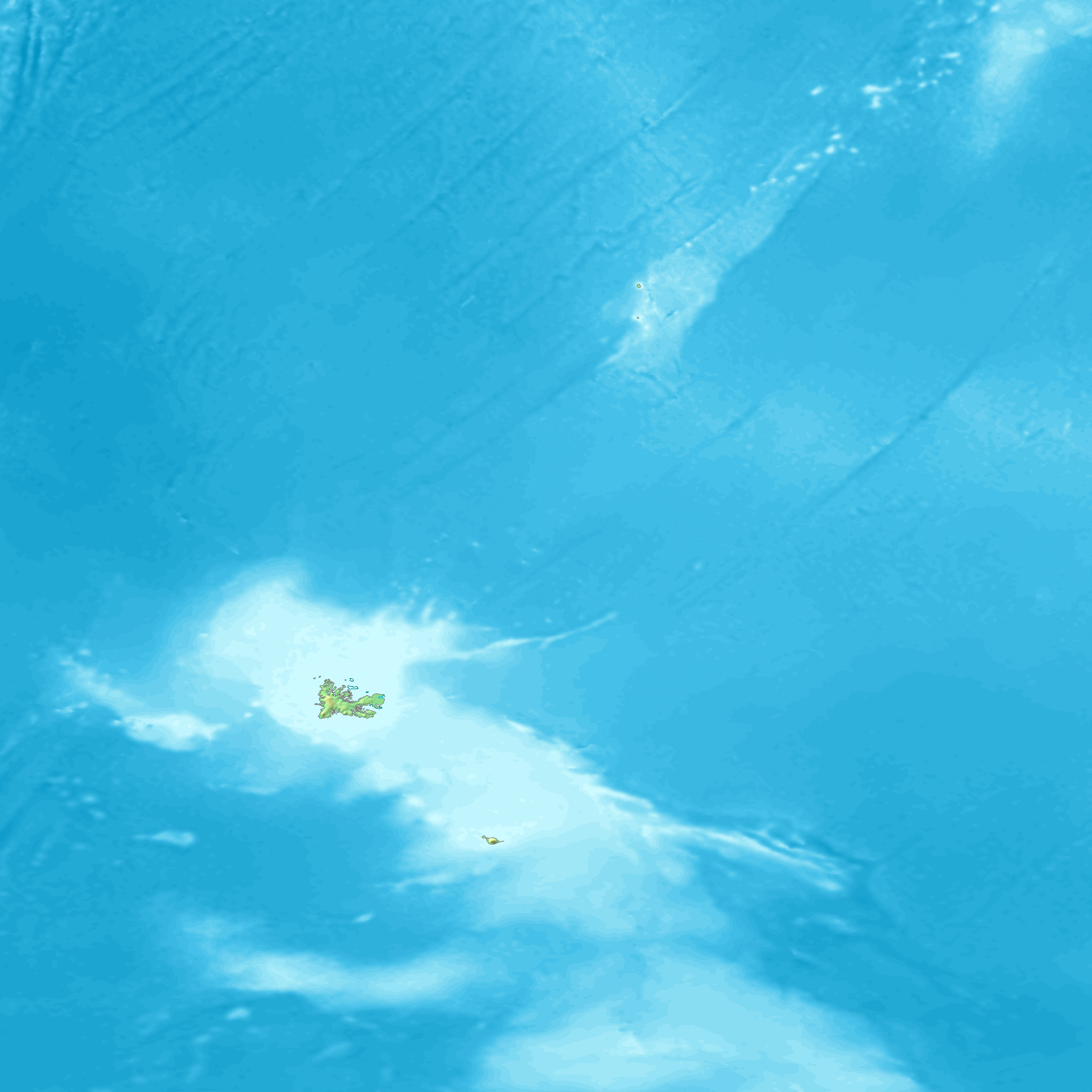

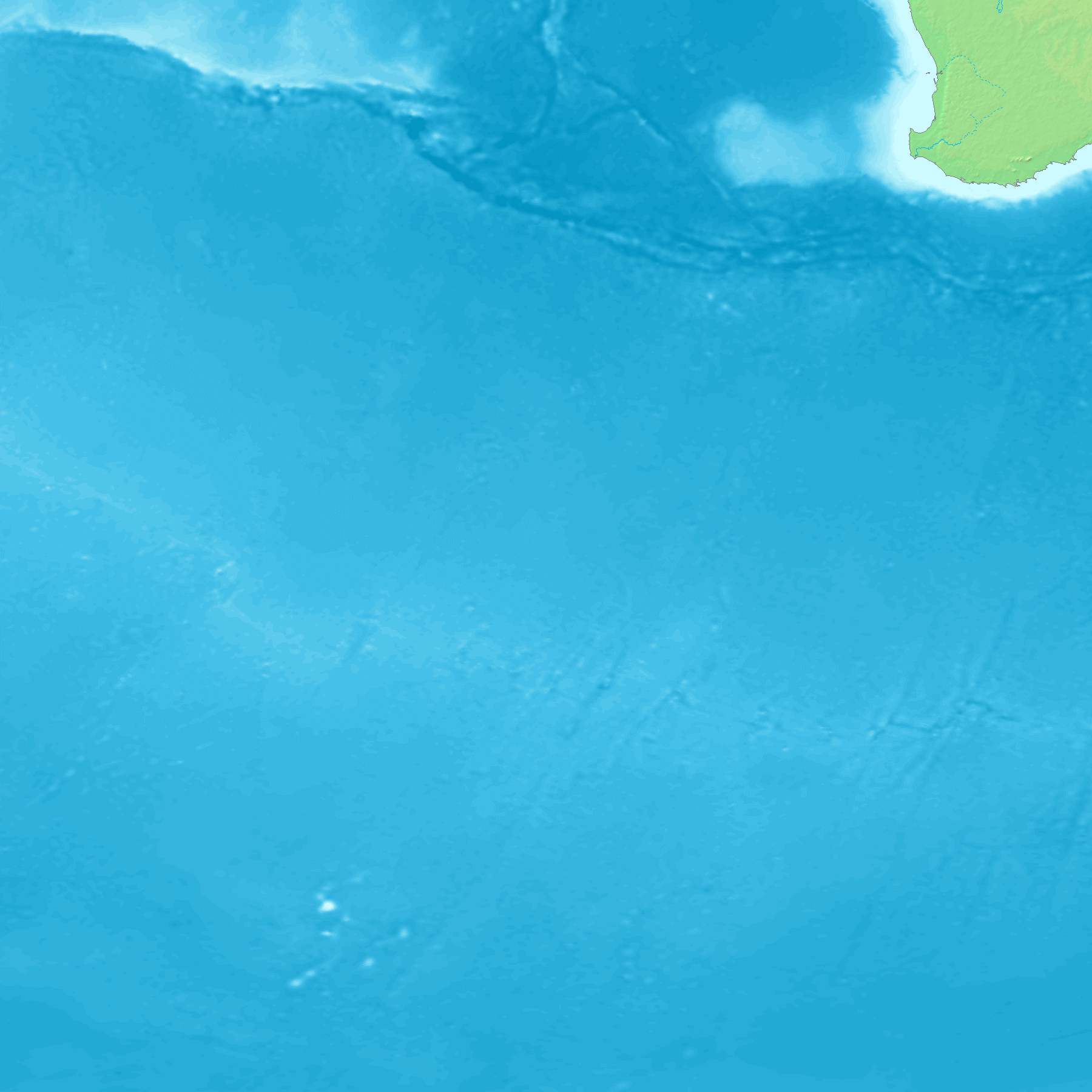

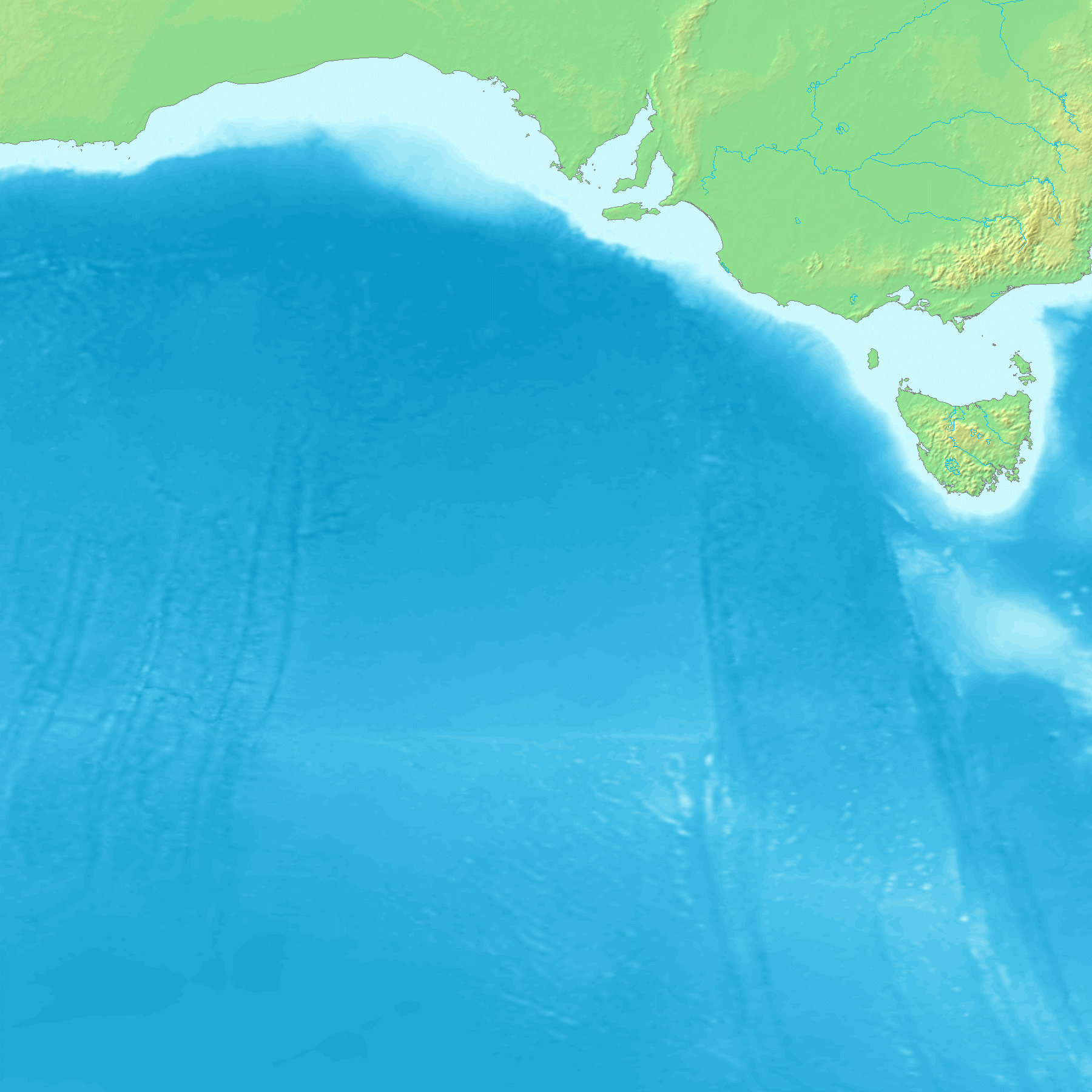

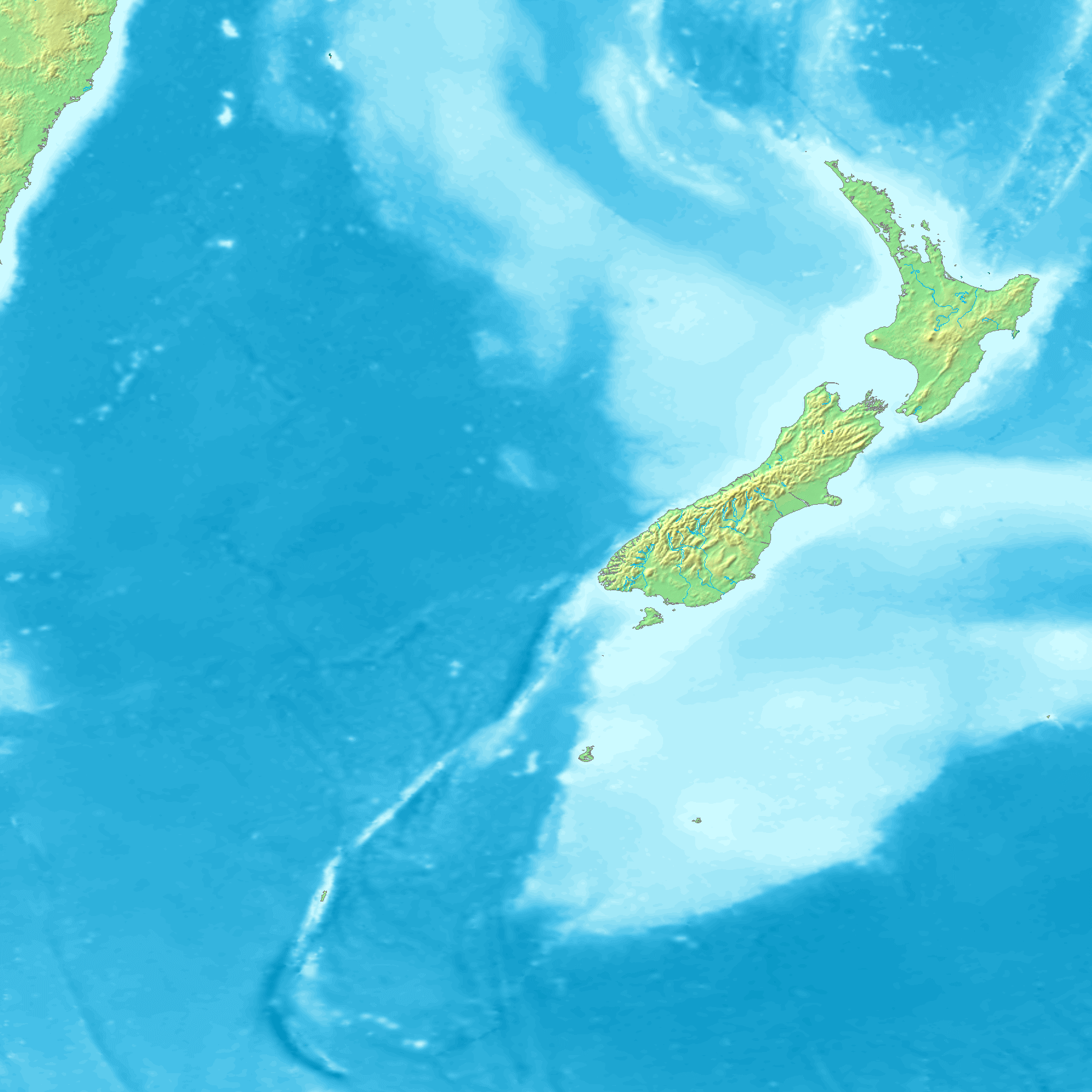

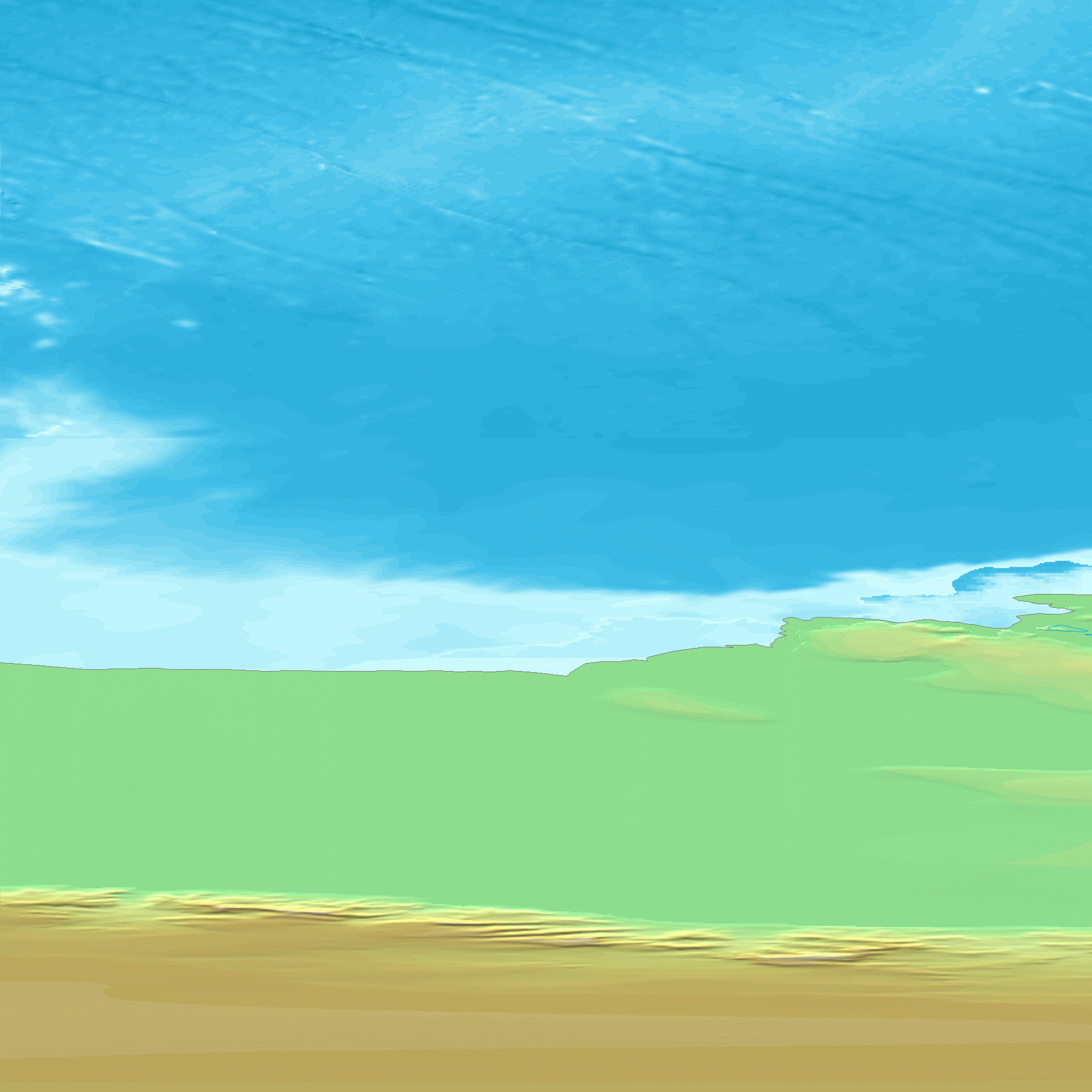

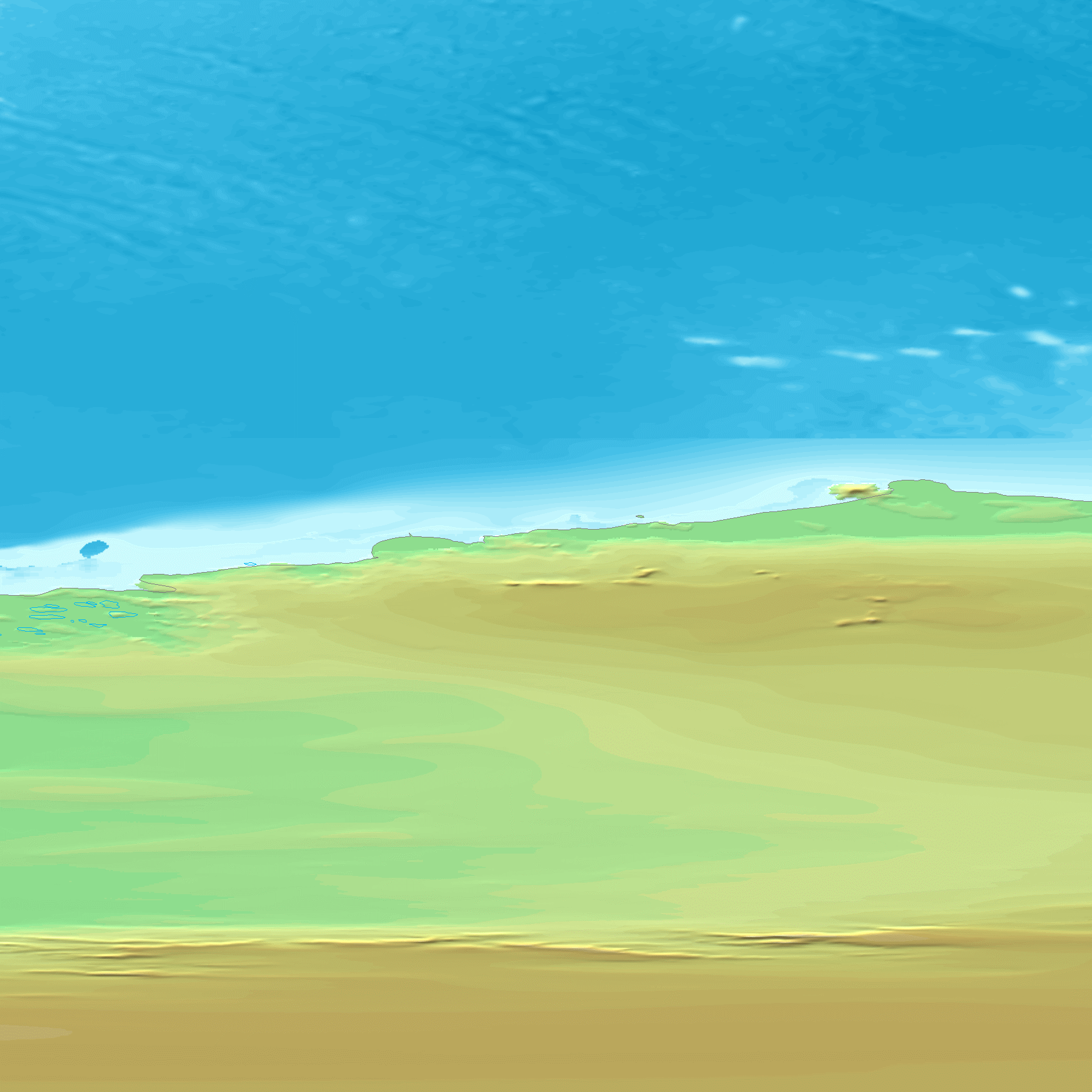

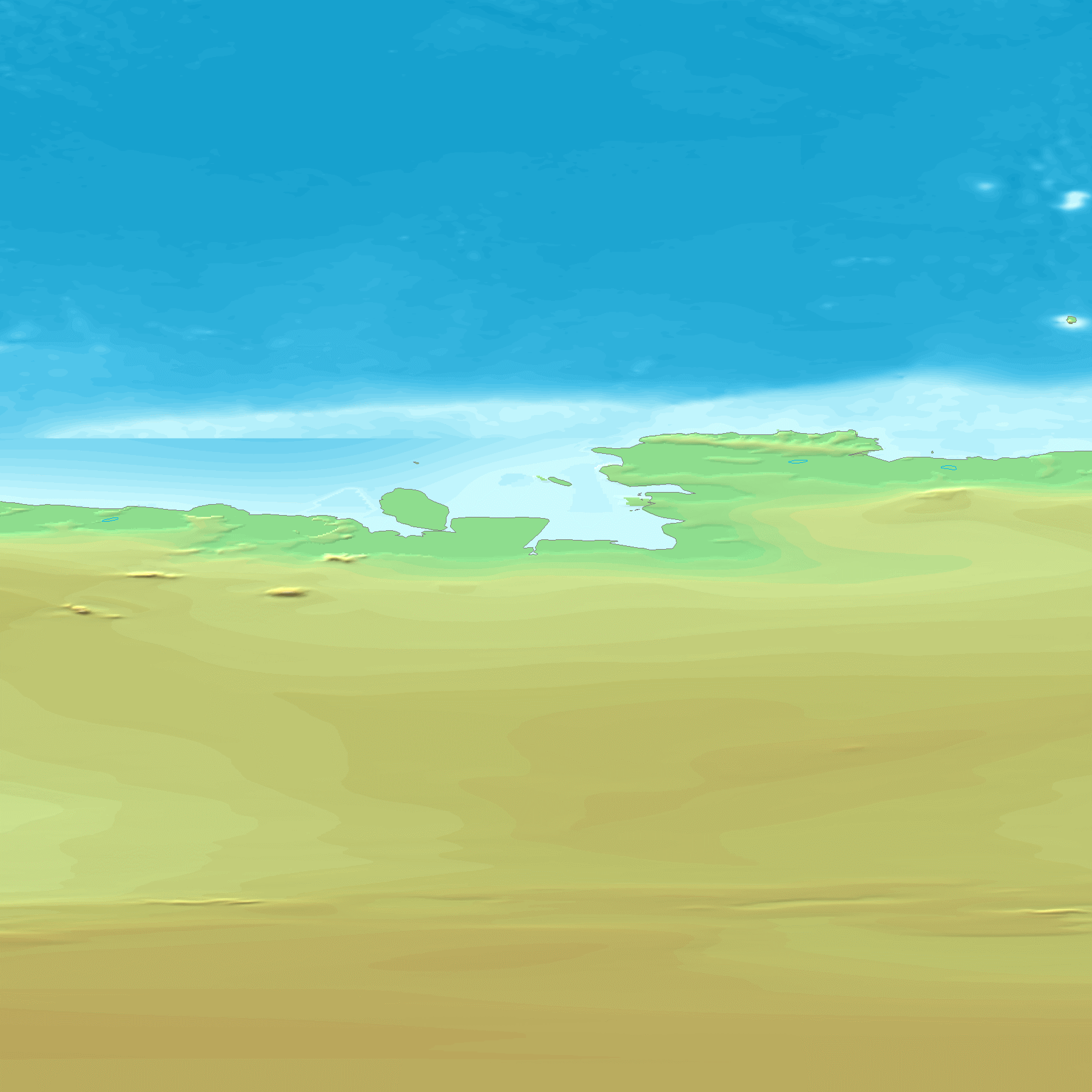

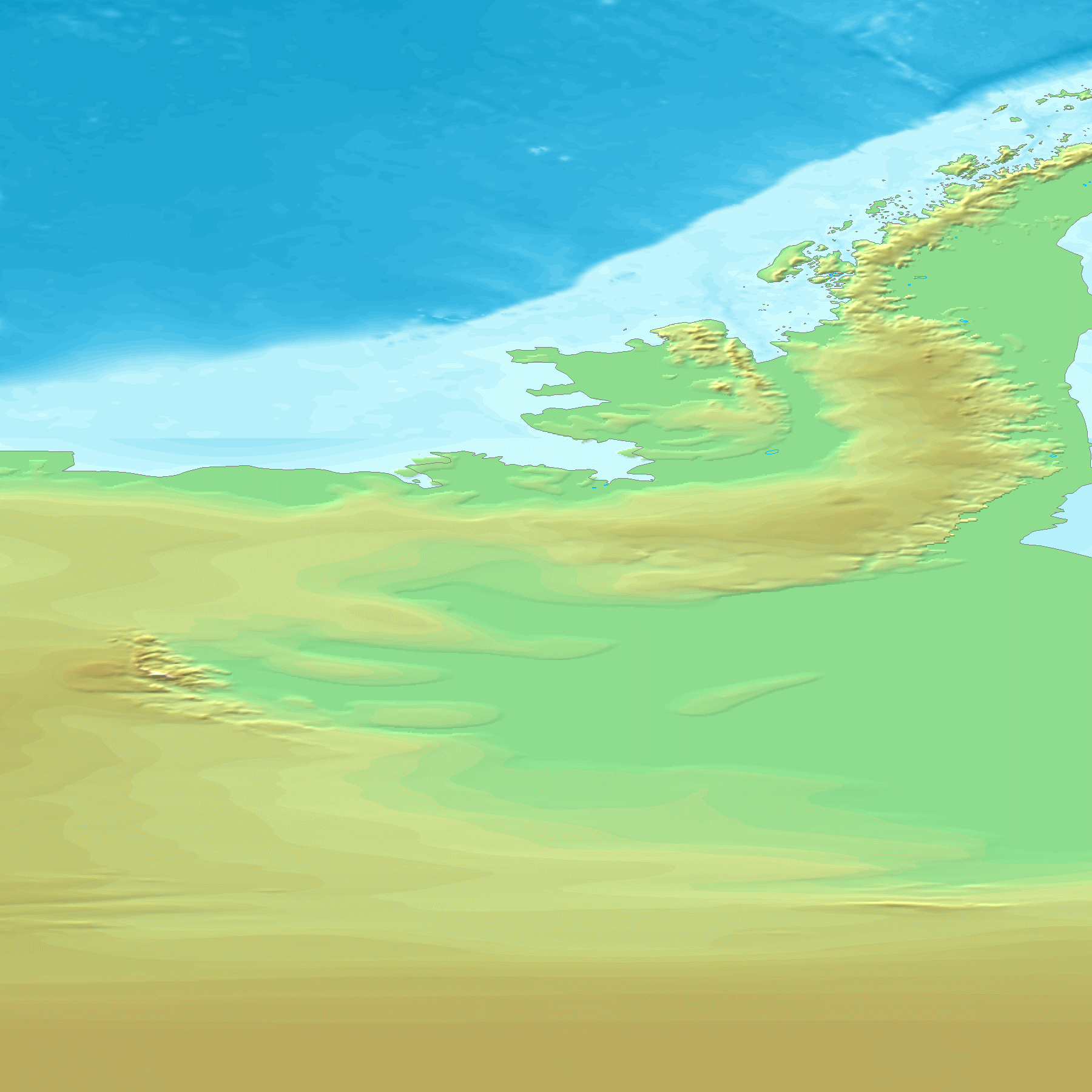

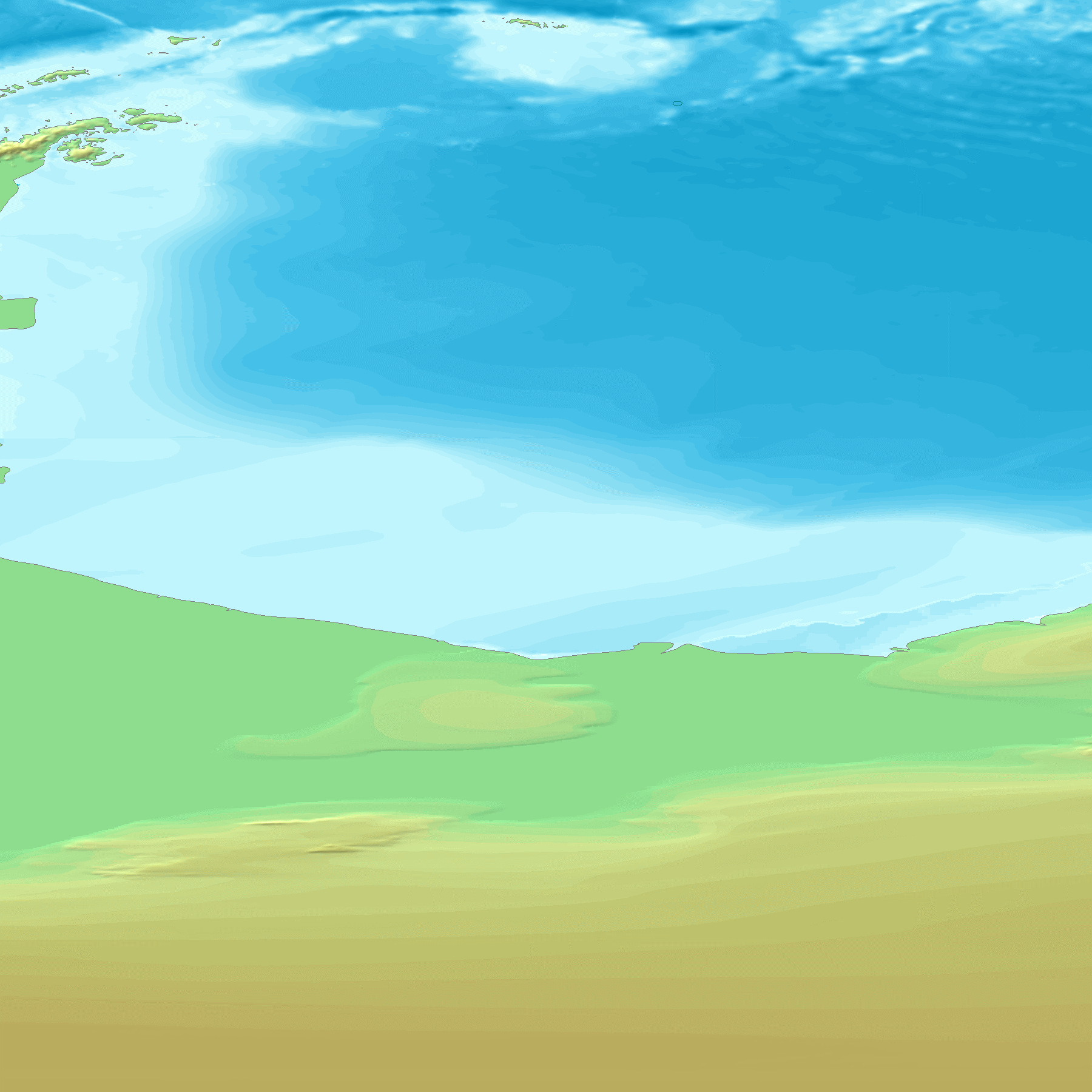

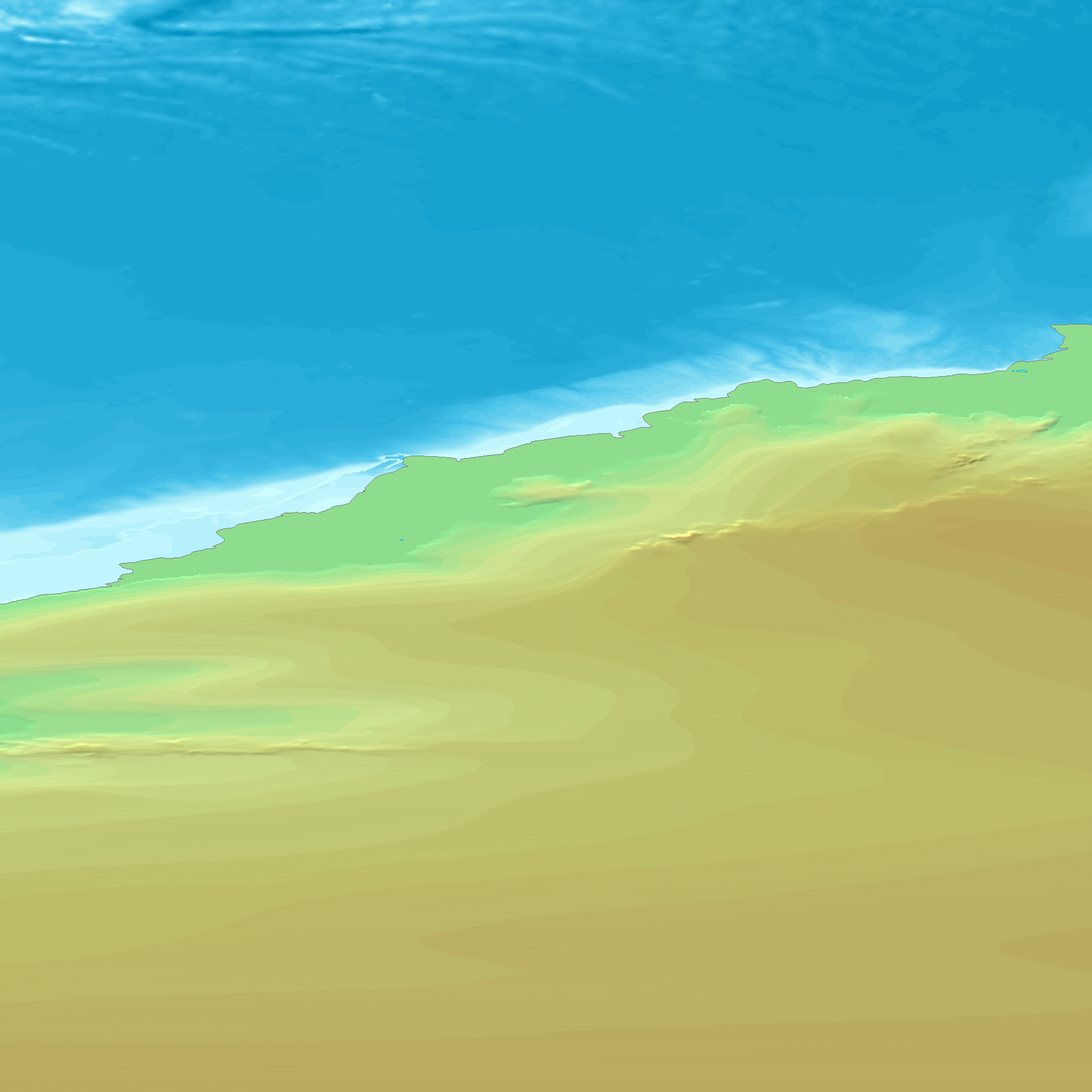

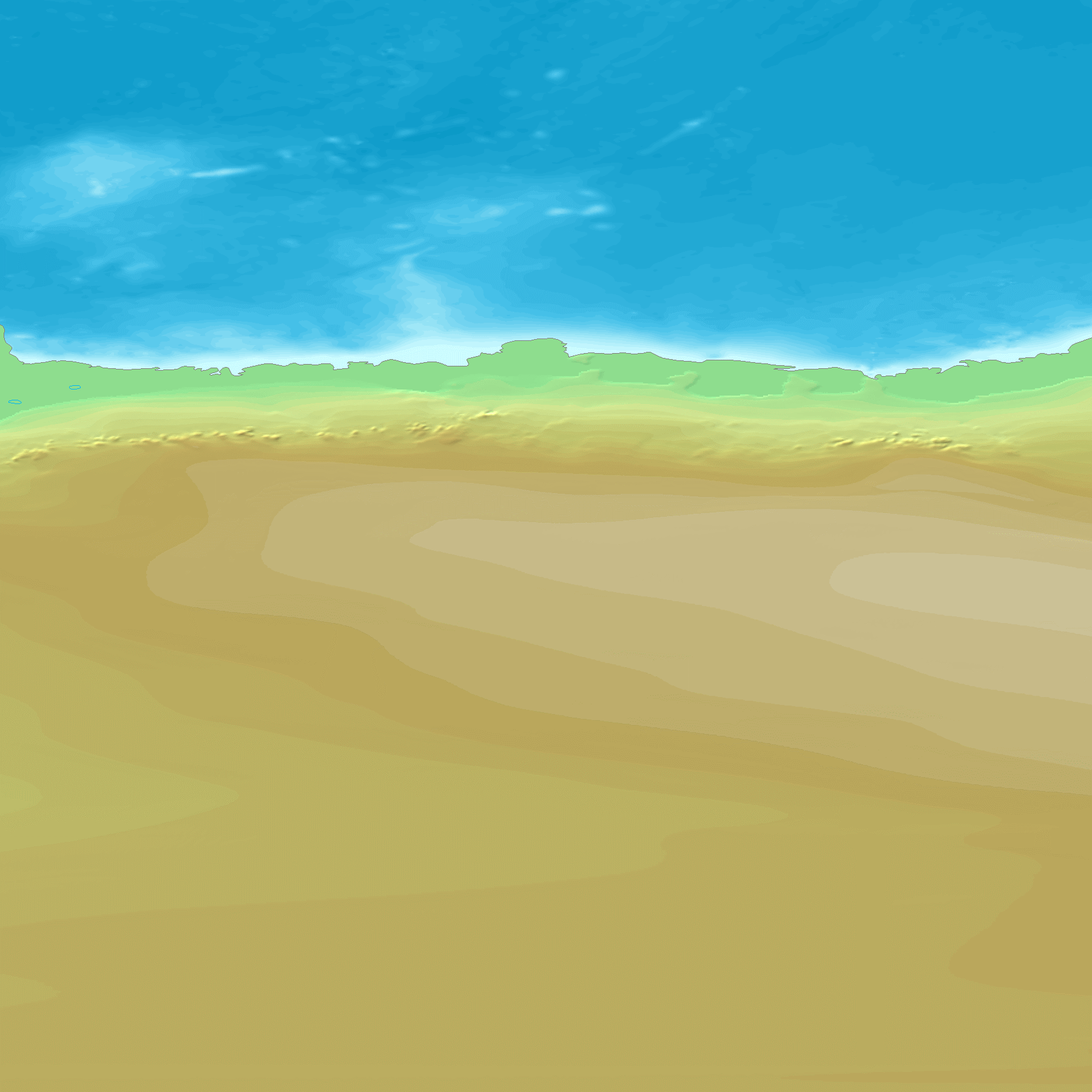

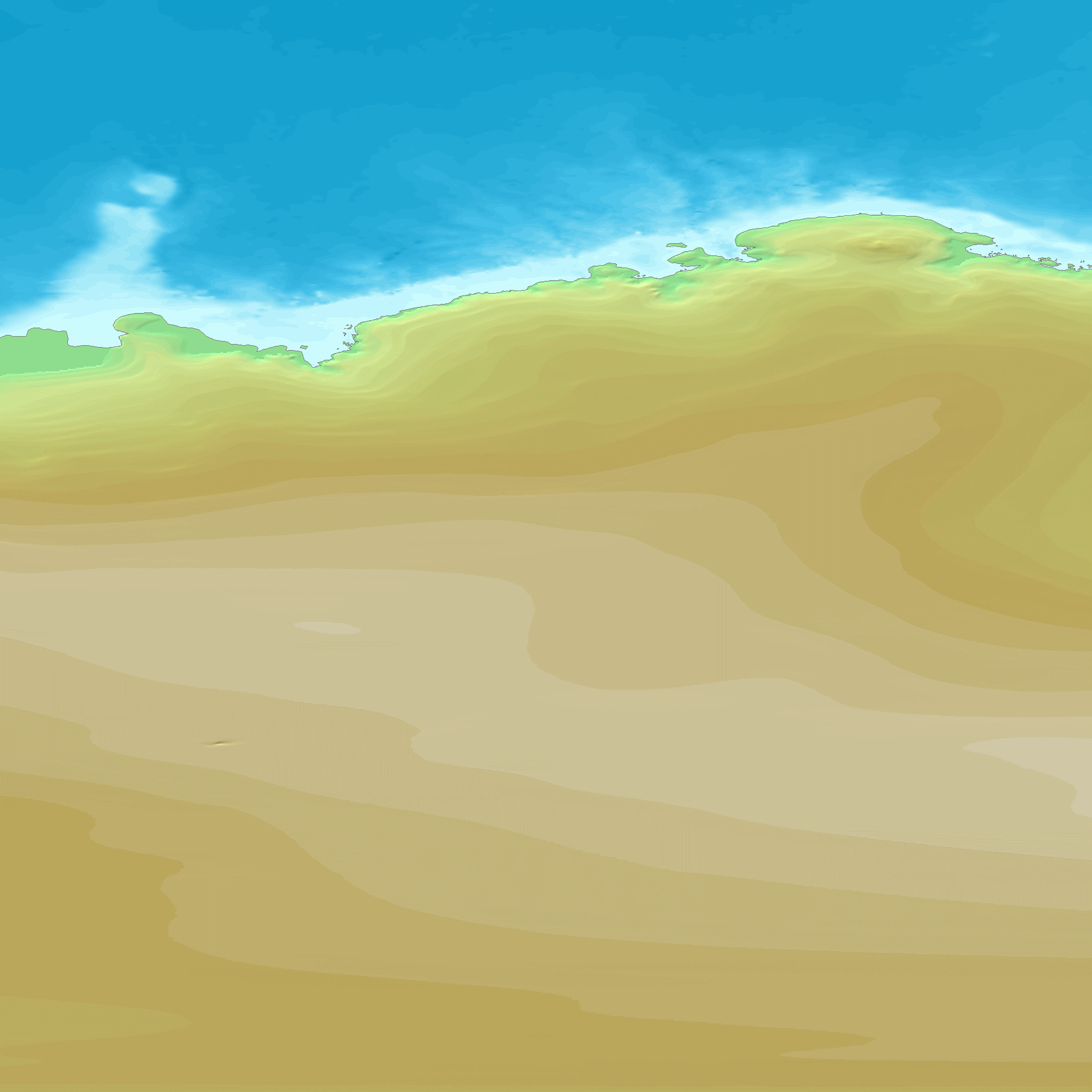

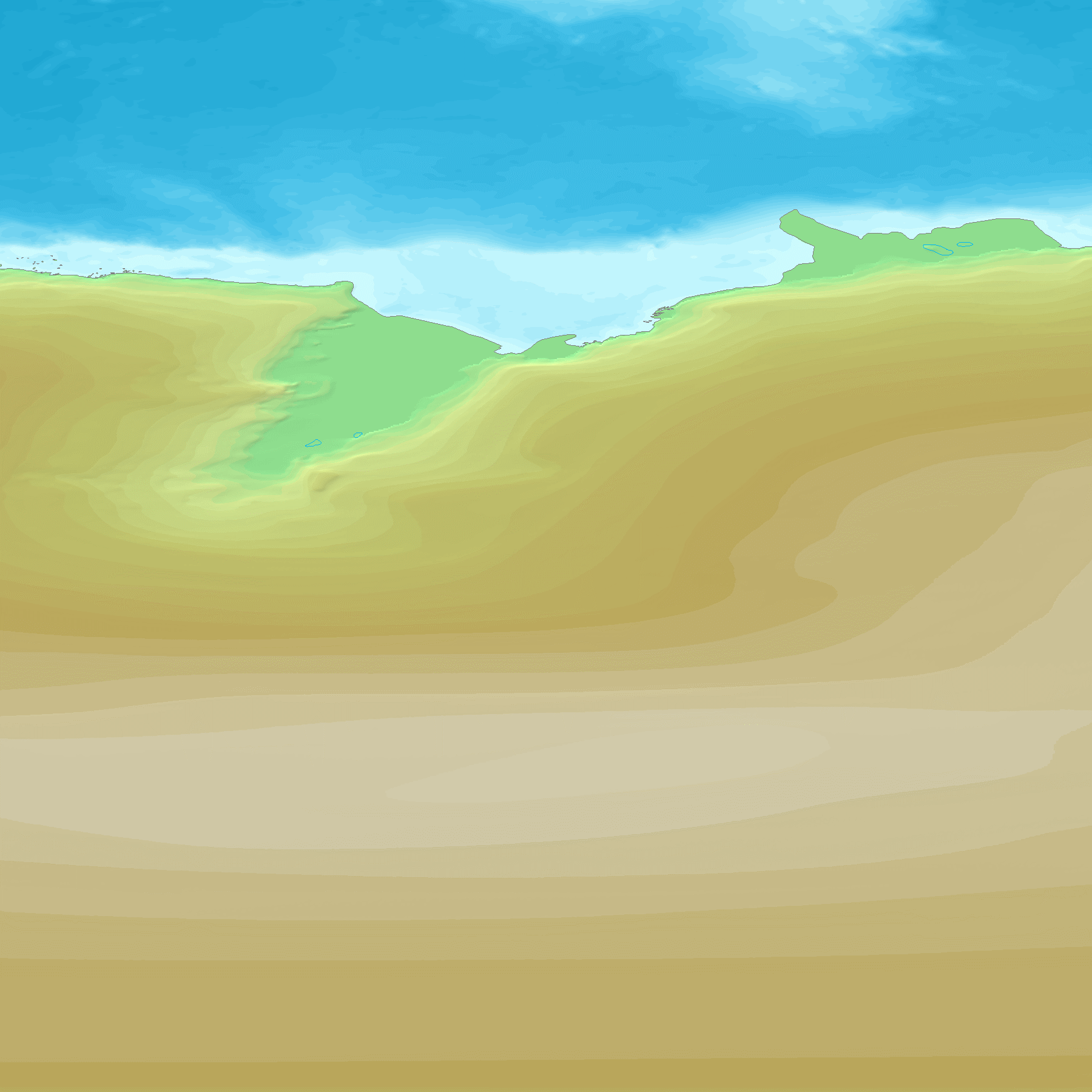

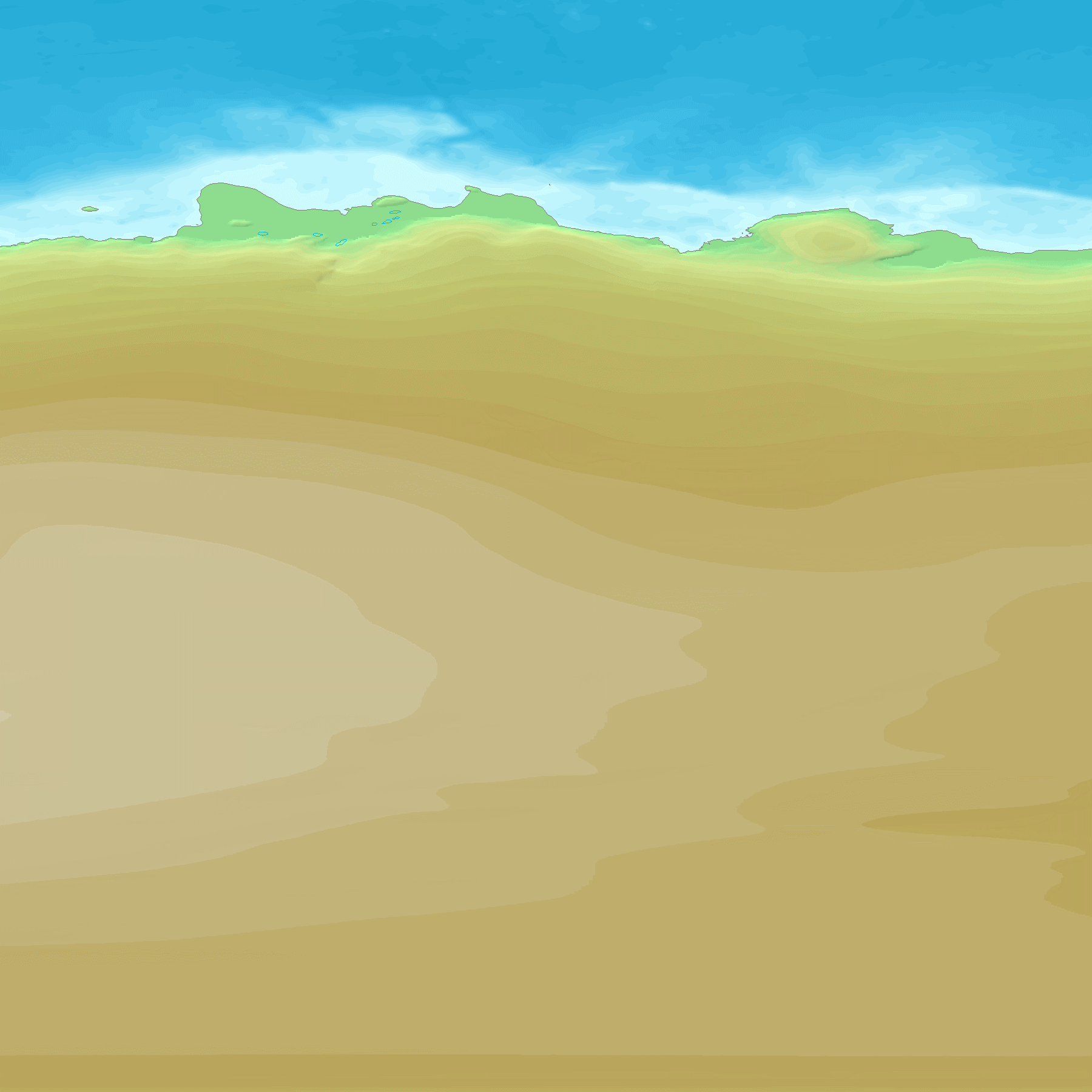

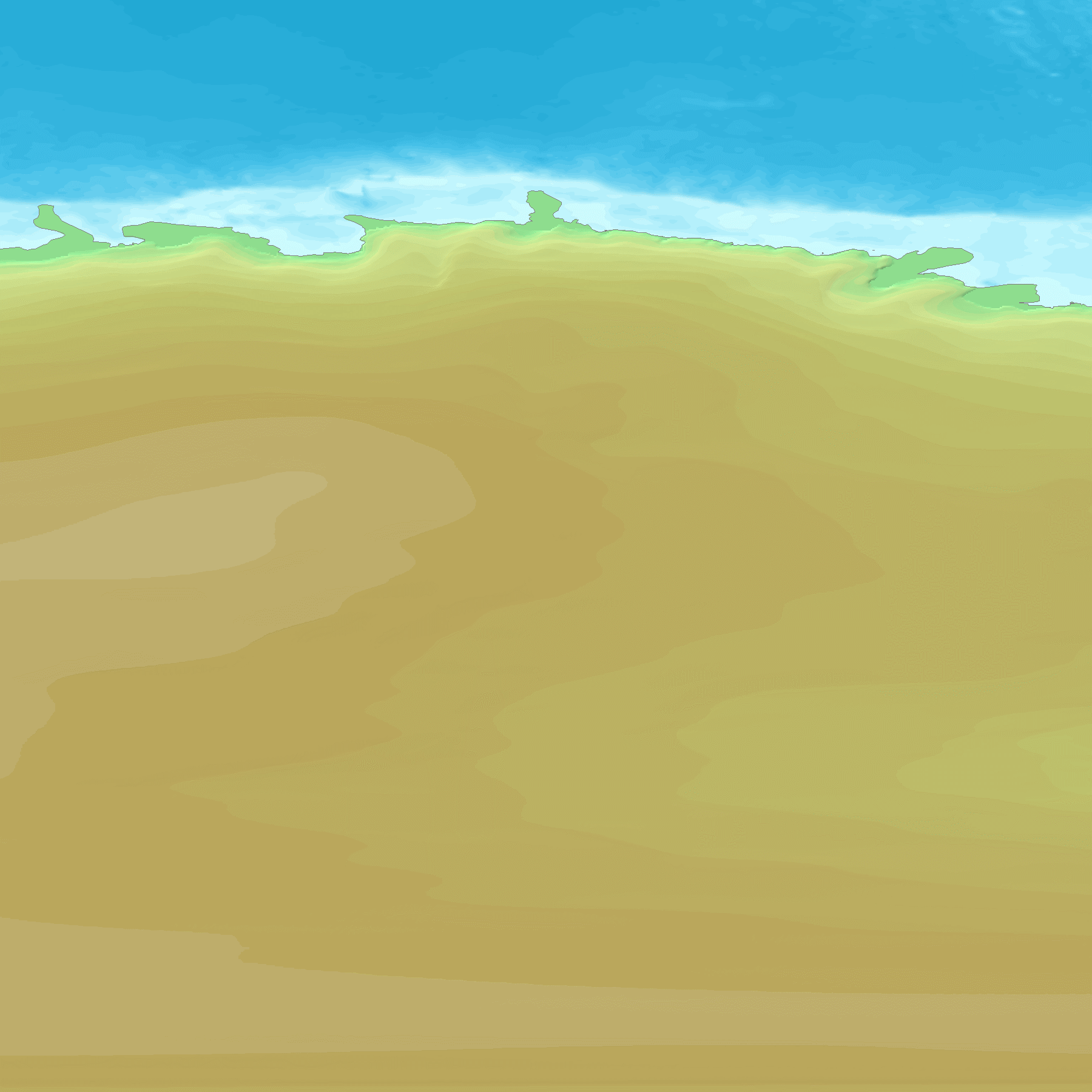

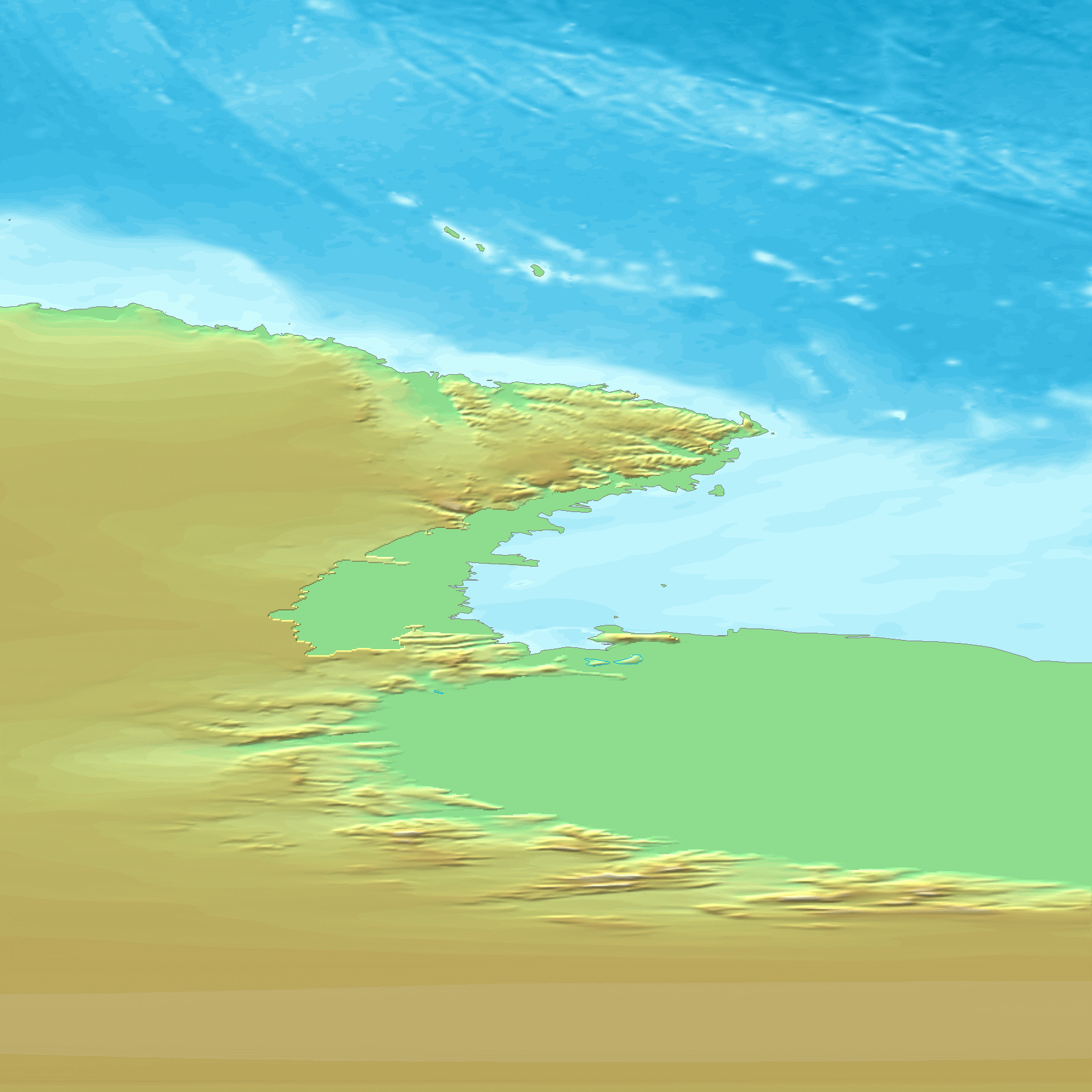

Each tile is available at a resolution of 1800 × 1800 pixels (approximate file size 1 MB, 60 pixels = 1 degree, 1 pixel = 1 minute)

== See also ==
- Shuttle Radar Topography Mission
- Advanced Spaceborne Thermal Emission and Reflection Radiometer
