= Navigation surface =

In hydrography, the Navigation Surface paradigm represents an alternative to traditional approaches to manage bathymetric data by creating bathymetric databases that can be used to generate high-resolution navigation aids and other applications.

The paradigm also provides methods to manipulate the data to create products for various applications (e.g., thematic maps for marine geology, acoustic seabed classification and marine biology).

== History ==
Recent technological developments in hydrography (e.g., large adoption of multibeam echosounder and electronic navigational charts) have pushed hydrographic organizations to adopt a new production paradigm centered on gridded surfaces rather than sounding-based workflow and products.

Based on such a shift, the concept of navigation surface was introduced in 2003 to provide a seafloor model at the best resolution that the data support. Depth values for nautical charting are then derived by generalization of the available gridded surfaces. In addition, a quality assessment for each grid node of the navigation surface is created through an uncertainty layer.

The Open Navigation Surface (ONS) project designed a free, open-source code library to manage (read/write) the information required to create a Navigation Surface. The implementation of these requirements is represented by the Bathymetric Attributed Grid data format.

The US Navy has implemented a global navigation surface database using an infrastructure called DBDB-NV.
