= Bathymetric attributed grid =

Bathymetric Attributed Grid (BAG)
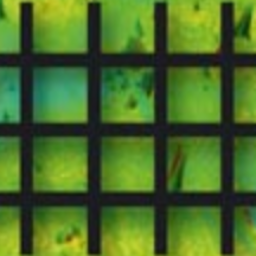
- Icon and logo for the Bathymetric Attributed Grid (BAG) format
- Filename extension: .bag
- Developed by: The Open Navigation Surface Working Group
- Latest release: 2.0.1; November 1, 2022; 3 years ago
- Type of format: Scientific data format
- Open format?: Yes
- Website: http://www.opennavsurf.org/index.html

Bathymetric Attributed Grid (BAG) is a file format designed to store and exchange bathymetric data. The implementation of the format was triggered by the large adoption of gridded bathymetry and the need of transferring the required information about bathymetry and associated uncertainty (i.e., metadata) between processing applications.

The BAG format was designed to provide a container format able to transfer all of the relevant information of a given bathymetric project. The creation and the access to the format is supported through a code base implemented in C++.

The format is supported by The Open Navigation Surface Working Group whose mission is to ensure its continued development. The format can be accessed using GDAL, currently in read-only mode. NOAA NCEI provides data products from the Hydrographic Survey Meta Data Base (HSMDB) in BAG format.

== History ==
The navigation surface concept requires to estimate not only the depth but also the uncertainty associated with it. Furthermore, to support safety of navigation applications, a means to over-ride automatically estimated depth with 'Hydrographer Privilege', that is to specify directly the depth determined by an analyst. Finally, the format metadata provide a way to describe the data, from collection to processing methods, from geospatial extents to the responsible party. The Open Navigation Surface (ONS) project implemented the format to incorporate all of these requirements as well as be portable, platform neutral, vendor-neutral.

The project started with the creation of mailing lists. After a Call for Participation, a first meeting was hosted by the Center for Coastal & Ocean Mapping on 21–23 January 2004. Participants from CARIS, CCOM/JHC, IVS, NOAA, NAVO, SAIC, and SevenCs attended this first meeting. The outcome was the definition of the requirements and structure for the format.

The following meeting was held on 18–22 July 2005 resulting in an alpha building of the library. The use of the library was then demonstrated at Shallow Survey 2005 conference using a number of processing applications (i.e., IVS Fledermaus, CARIS HIPS, and SAIC SABER).

The first stable version (v.1.0.0) of the library was released on 8 April 2006.

In April 2012, the IHO S-102 Bathymetric Surface Product Specification become the first S-100-based standard to be officially adopted. The standard is based on the BAG format (version 1.4).

With release 1.6, the optional support for variable resolution digital elevation model was introduced.

== Interfaces ==
=== Officially supported APIs ===
- C++
- Python

== See also ==
- GDAL - Open-source BAG reader
- Generic sensor format
- Hierarchical Data Format (HDF)
