= GSF =

GSF may refer to:

- Gamlakarleby Segelförening, a Finnish yacht club
- Gang Suppression Force, international anti-gang force in Haiti
- Generic sensor format, used for storing bathymetry data
- Genoa Social Forum
- Georgia Southern and Florida Railway
- Glasgow Science Festival
- Global Sanitation Fund
- GlobalSantaFe Corporation, a defunct American offshore oil and gas company
- Global Strategy Forum
- Global Sumud Flotilla, an attempt to break the Israeli blockade of the Gaza Strip
- Golden State Foods, an American food service company
- Golden Star Ferries, Greek ferry operator
- GoSports Foundation
- Grand slam force, in contract bridge
- Grieg Seafood, a Norwegian seafood company
- Suzuki Bandit series, a series of motorcycles
