= Global relief model =

Model of Earth's relief including elevation and depth underwater

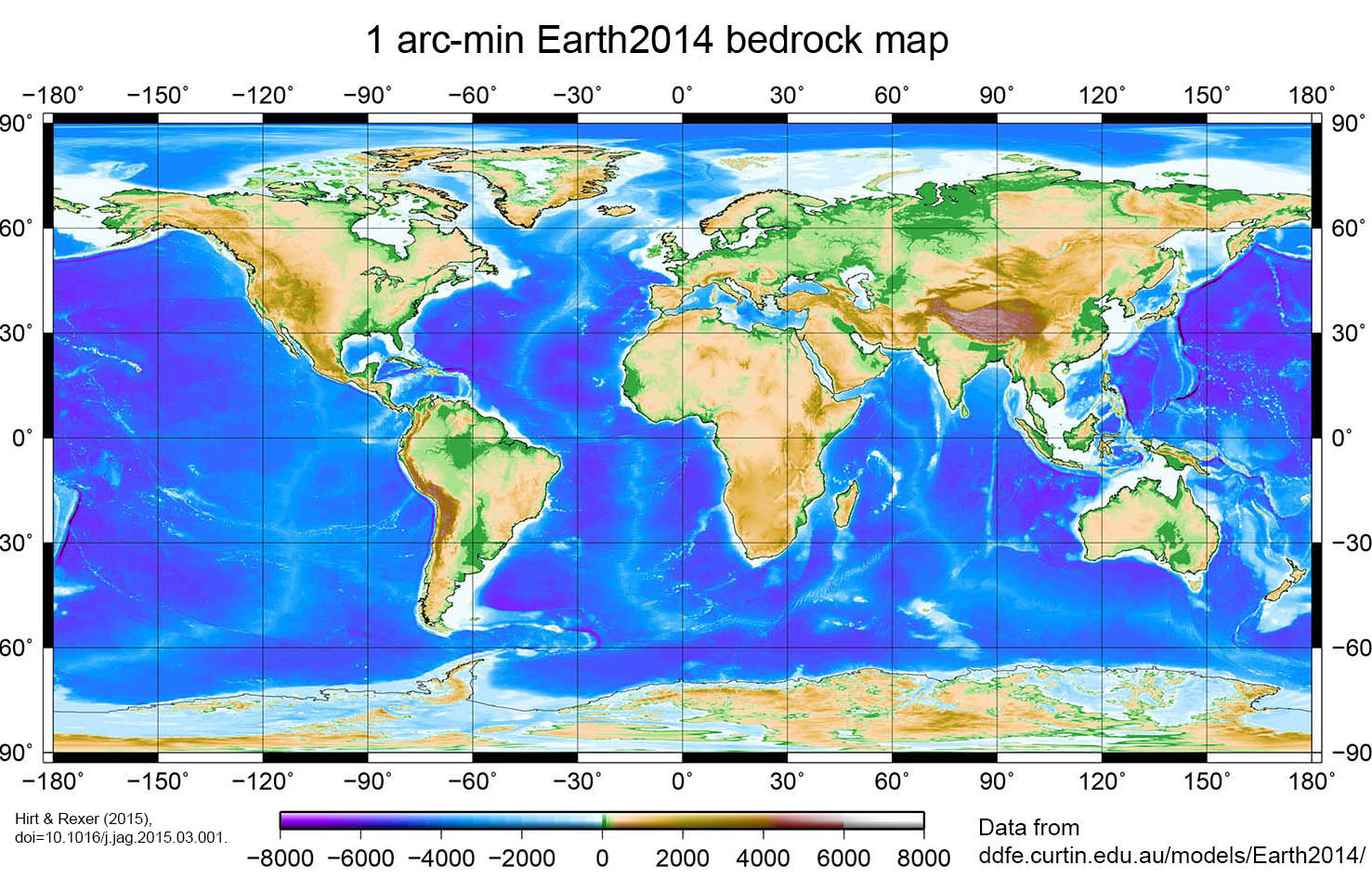
Example of a global relief model: Earth2014 bedrock layer (topography over land, bathymetry over oceans and major lakes, sub-ice-topography over ice-shields)

STL 3D model of Earth without liquid water but with ice, with 20× elevation exaggeration

A global relief model, sometimes also denoted as global topography model or composite model, combines digital elevation model (DEM) data over land with digital bathymetry model (DBM) data over water-covered areas (oceans, lakes) to describe Earth's relief. A relief model thus shows how Earth's surface would look in the absence of water or ice masses.

The relief is represented by a set of heights (elevations or depths) that refer to some height reference surface, often the mean sea level or the geoid. Global relief models are used for a variety of applications including geovisualization, geologic, geomorphologic and geophysical analyses, gravity field modelling as well as geo-statistics.

== Measurement ==
Global relief models are always based on combinations of data sets from different remote sensing techniques. This is because there is no single remote sensing technique that would allow measurement of the relief both over dry and water-covered areas. Elevation data over land is often obtained from LIDAR or inSAR measurements, while bathymetry is acquired based on SONAR and altimetry. Global relief models may also contain elevations of the bedrock (sub-ice-topography) below the ice shields of Antarctica and Greenland. Ice sheet thickness, mostly measured through ice-penetrating RADAR, is subtracted from the ice surface heights to reveal the bedrock.

== Spatial resolution ==
While digital elevation models describe Earth's land topography often with 1 to 3 arc-second resolution (e.g., from the SRTM or ASTER missions), the global bathymetry (e.g., SRTM30_PLUS) is known to a much lesser spatial resolution in the kilometre-range. The same holds true for models of the bedrock of Antarctica and Greenland. Therefore, global relief models are often constructed at 1 arc-minute resolution (corresponding to about 1.8 km postings). Some products such as the 30 and 15 arc-second resolution SRTM30_PLUS/ SRTM15_PLUS grids offer higher resolution to adequately represent SONAR depth measurements where available. Although grid cells are spaced at 15 or 30 arc-seconds, when SONAR measurements are unavailable, the resolution is much worse (~20-12 km) depending on factors such as water depth.

== Public data sets ==
Data sets produced and released to the public include Earth2014, SRTM30_PLUS and ETOPO1.

=== ETOPO 2022 ===
The 2022 ETOPO version is the most recent global relief model with several scans at 1 arc-min, 30 arc-sec, and 15 arc-sec resolutions. The ETOPO Global Relief Model combines topographic, bathymetric, and shoreline data from regional and global sources to provide high-resolution representations of Earth's surface. It supports applications such as tsunami forecasting, ocean circulation modeling, and Earth visualization. The latest version, ETOPO 2022, is available in two formats: Ice Surface, depicting the top of ice sheets in Greenland and Antarctica, and Bedrock, showing the underlying terrain.

=== Earth2014 (2015) ===
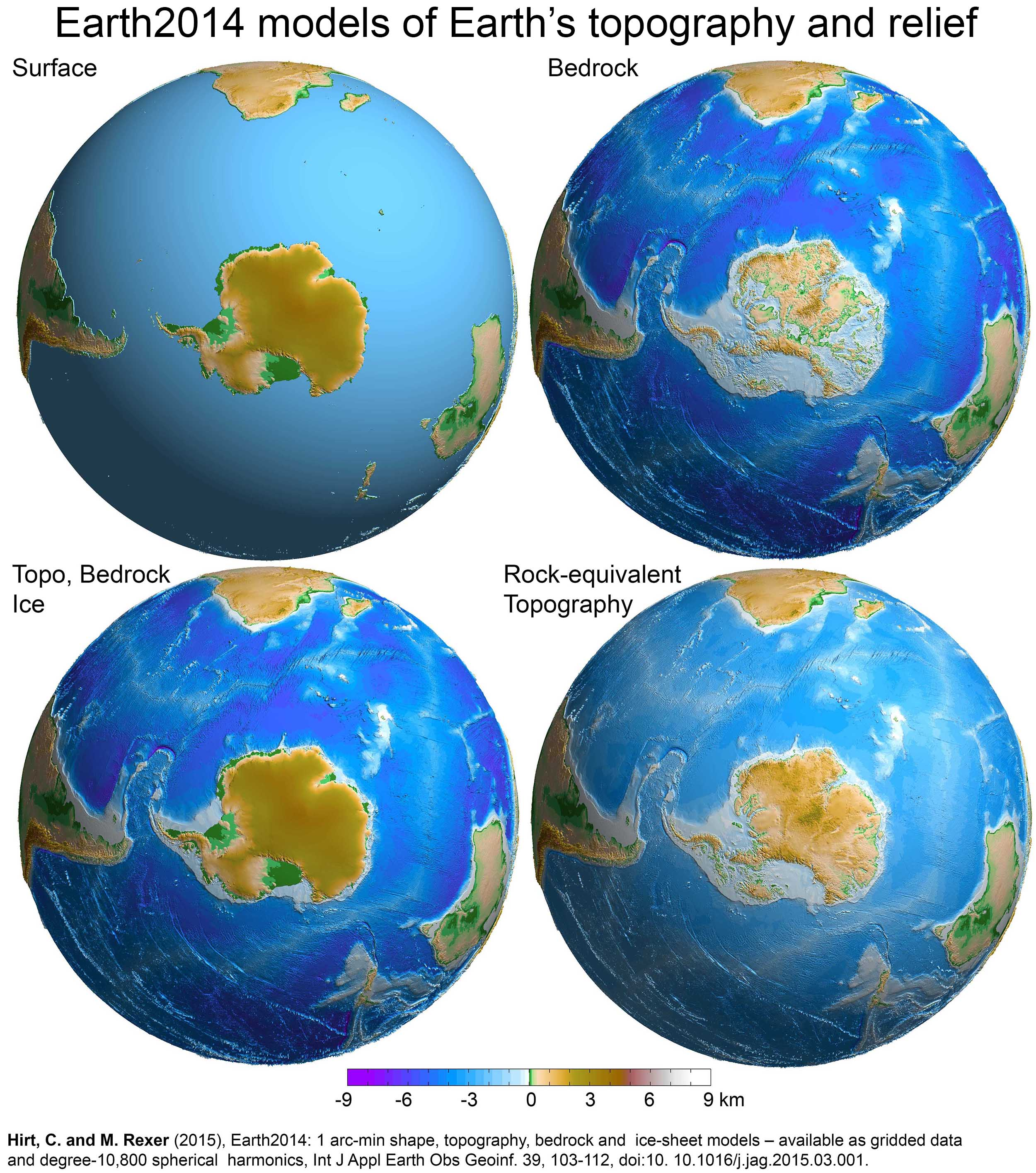
Four different topography layers of the Earth2014 model. Clockwise from top left: (1) Earth's surface, (2) bedrock, (3) rock-equivalent topography, (4) bathymetry and ice surface

The Earth2014 global relief model, developed at Curtin University (Western Australia) and TU Munich (Germany). Earth2014 provides sets of 1 arc-min resolution global grids (about 1.8 km postings) of Earth's relief in different representations based on the 2013 releases of bedrock and ice-sheet data over Antarctica (Bedmap2) and Greenland (Greenland Bedrock Topography), the 2013 SRTM_30PLUS bathymetry and 2008 SRTM V4.1 land topography.

Earth2014 provides five different layers of height data, including Earth's surface (lower interface of the atmosphere), topography and bathymetry of the oceans and major lakes, topography, bathymetry and bedrock, ice-sheet thicknesses and rock-equivalent topography. The Earth2014 global grids are provided as heights relative to the EGM96 mean sea level for the conventional relief model, and as planetary radii relative to the centre of Earth to show the shape of the Earth.

=== SRTM30_PLUS (2014) ===
SRTM30_PLUS is a combined bathymetry and topography model produced by Scripps Institution of Oceanography (California). The version 15_PLUS comes at 0.25 arc-min resolution (about 450 m postings), while the 30_PLUS version offers 0.5 arc-min (900 m) resolution. The bathymetric data in SRTM30_PLUS stems from depth soundings (SONAR) and from satellite altimetry. The bathymetric component of SRTM30_PLUS gets regularly updated with new or improved data sets in order to continuously improve and refine the description of the sea floor geometry. Over land areas, SRTM30 data from the USGS is included. SRTM30_PLUS provides background information for Google Earth and Google Maps.

=== ETOPO1 (2009) ===
The ETOPO1 1-arcmin global relief model, produced by the National Geophysical Data Center (Colorado), provides two layers of relief information. One layer represents the global relief including bedrock over Antarctica and Greenland, and another layer the global relief including ice surface heights. Both layers include bathymetry over the oceans and some of Earth's major lakes. ETOPO1 land topography and ocean bathymetry relies on SRTM30 topography and a multitude of bathymetric surveys that have been merged. Historical versions of ETOPO1 are the ETOPO2 and ETOPO5 relief models (2 and 5 arc-min resolution).

The ETOPO1 global relief model is based on the 2001 Bedmap1 model of bedrock over Antarctica, which is now superseded by the significantly improved Bedmap2 bedrock data. The ETOPO1-contained information on ocean depths is superseded through several updates of the SRTM30_PLUS bathymetry.
