= DTED =

Digital dataset standard

DTED (or Digital Terrain Elevation Data) is a standard of digital datasets which consists of a matrix of terrain elevation values, i.e., a Digital Elevation Model. This standard was originally developed in the 1970s to support aircraft radar simulation and prediction. Terrain elevations are described as the height above the Earth Gravitational Model 1996 (EGM96) geoid, not the WGS84 reference ellipsoid.

DTED supports many applications, including line-of-sight analyses, terrain profiling, 3-D terrain visualization, mission planning/rehearsal, and modeling and simulation. DTED is a standard National Geospatial-Intelligence Agency (NGA) product that provides medium resolution, quantitative data in a digital format for military system applications that require terrain elevation.

The DTED format for level 0, 1 and 2 is described in U.S. Military Specification Digital Terrain Elevation Data (DTED) MIL-PRF-89020B, and amongst other parameters describes the resolution for each level:

- Level 0 has a post spacing of approximately 900 meters.
- Level 1 has a post spacing of approximately 90 meters.
- Level 2 has a post spacing of approximately 30 meters.

The precise spacing is defined by dividing the world into zones based on latitude, and is given in the following table:

	zone	latitude range	level 0 (arc secs)	level 1 (arc secs)	level 2 (arc secs)
latitude spacing	all		30	3	1
longitude spacing	I	0°–50° (North–South)	30	3	1
longitude spacing	II	50°–70° (North–South)	60	6	2
longitude spacing	III	70°–75° (North–South)	90	9	3
longitude spacing	IV	75°–80° (North–South)	120	12	4
longitude spacing	V	80°–90° (North–South)	180	18	6

In addition three more levels (3, 4 and 5) at increasing resolution have been proposed, but not yet standardized.

DTED data is stored in a big endian format where negative numbers are signed magnitude.
