= Outcrop =

Visible exposure of bedrock or ancient superficial deposits on the surface of the Earth

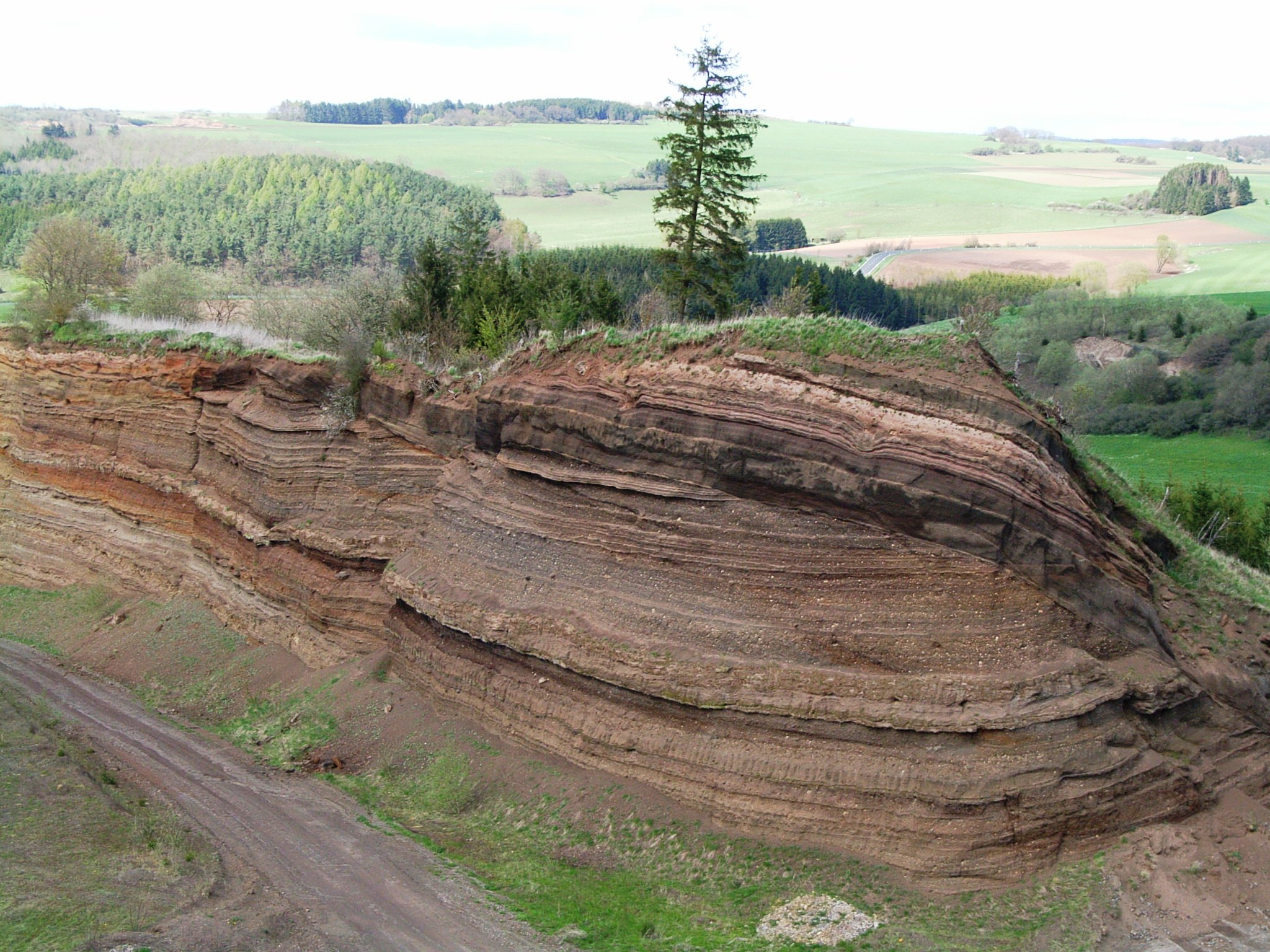
Outcrop of volcanic rock in Germany

An outcrop or rocky outcrop is a visible exposure of bedrock or ancient superficial deposits on the surface of the Earth and other terrestrial planets.

== Features ==
In most places, bedrock or superficial deposits are covered by soil and vegetation. Where these are removed through erosion, tectonic uplift, or excavation by humans, the underlying rock may crop out, or be exposed. Most frequently, this occurs on steep hillsides, mountain ridges and mountaintops, river banks, and areas which are tectonically active. For example, Finland has many coastal and littoral outcrops due to glacial erosion during the last glacial maximum (c. 11000 BC), followed by scouring by sea waves, then isostatic uplift.

== Study ==
Outcrops allow direct observation and sampling of the bedrock in situ for geologic analysis and creating geological maps. In situ measurements are critical for proper analysis of geological history and outcrops are therefore extremely important for understanding the geologic time scale of earth history. Some of the types of information that cannot be obtained except from bedrock outcrops or by precise drilling and coring operations, are structural geology features orientations (e.g. bedding planes, fold axes, foliation), depositional features orientations (e.g. paleo-current directions, grading, facies changes), paleomagnetic orientations. Outcrops are also very important for understanding fossil assemblages, and paleo-environment, and evolution as they provide a record of relative changes within geologic strata.

Accurate description, mapping, and sampling for laboratory analysis of outcrops made possible all of the geologic sciences and the development of fundamental geologic laws such as the law of superposition, the principle of original horizontality, principle of lateral continuity, and the principle of faunal succession.

== Types of outcrops ==
Outcrops occur in numerous forms, including, but not limited to:

- Cliffs
- Tors
- Escarpments
- Inselbergs

== Examples ==
On Ordnance Survey maps in Great Britain, cliffs are distinguished from outcrops: cliffs have a continuous line along the top edge with lines protruding down; outcrops have a continuous line around each area of bare rock. An outcrop example in California is the Vasquez Rocks, familiar from location shooting use in many films, composed of uplifted sandstone. Yana is another example of outcrops, located in Uttara Kannada district in Karnataka, India.

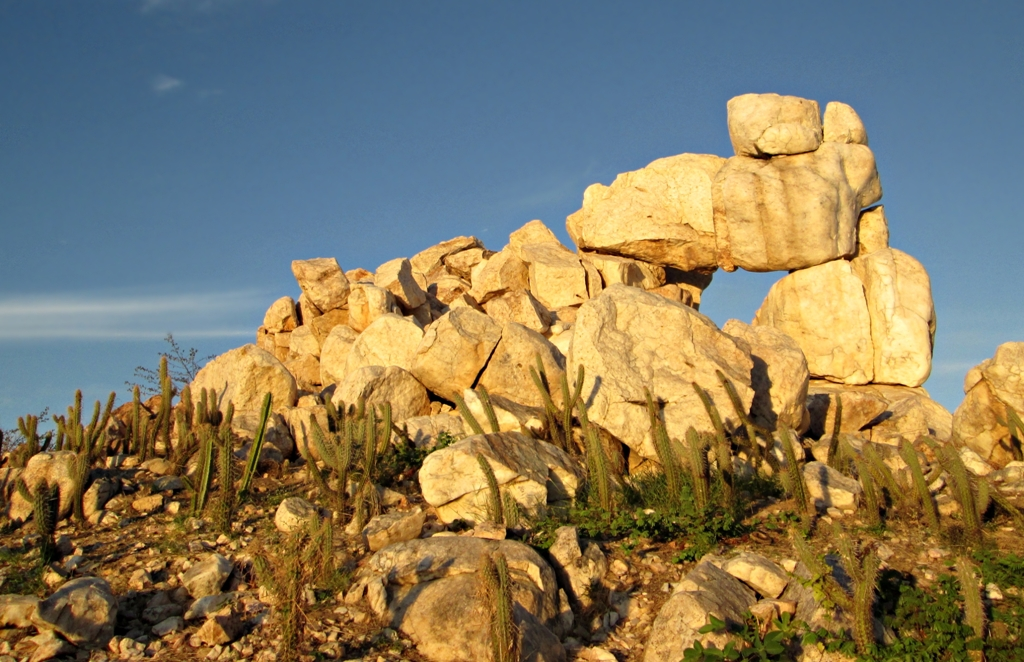
Serrote Branco outcrop in Caicó, Brazil

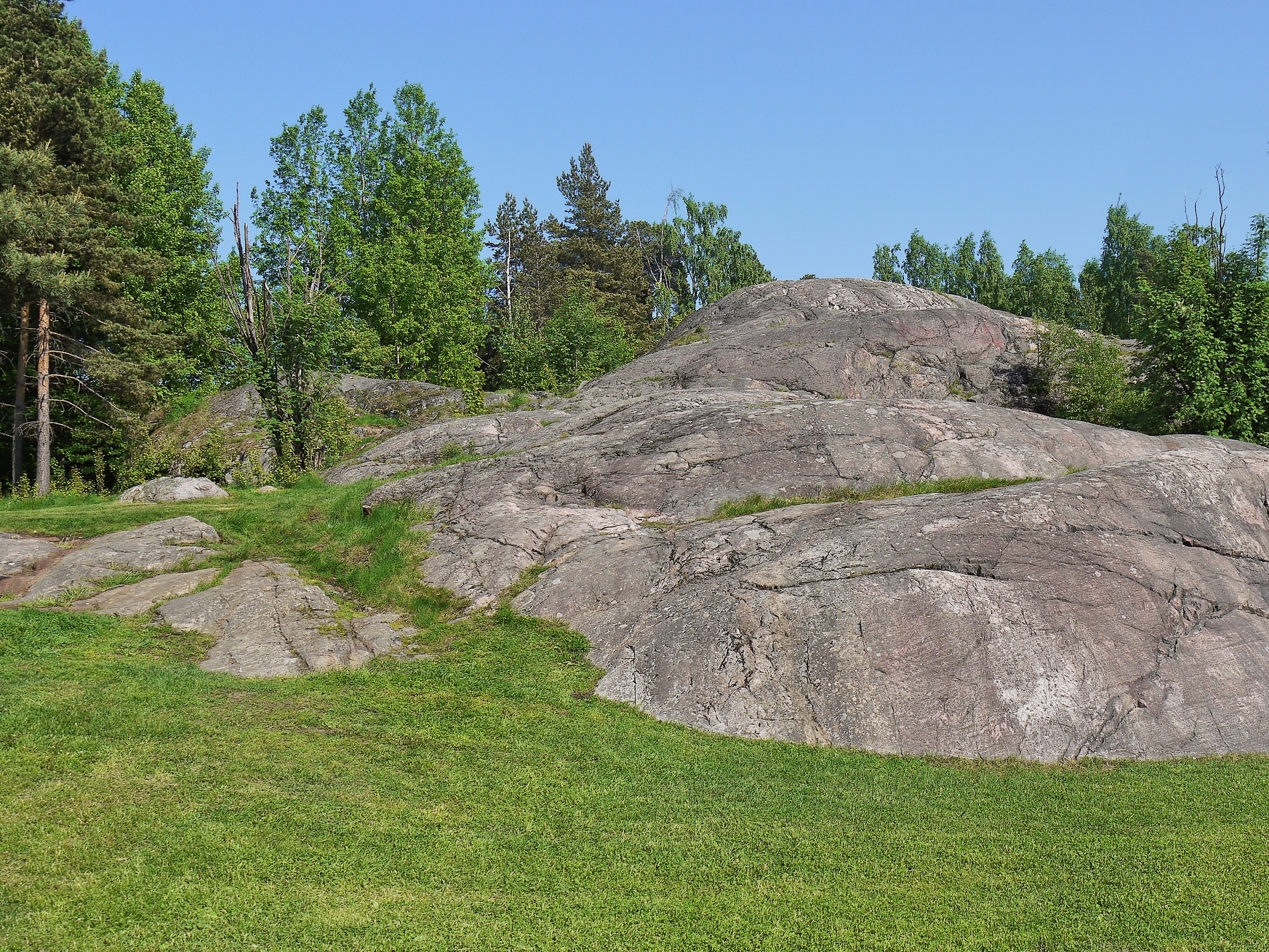
Precambrian outcrop in Finland

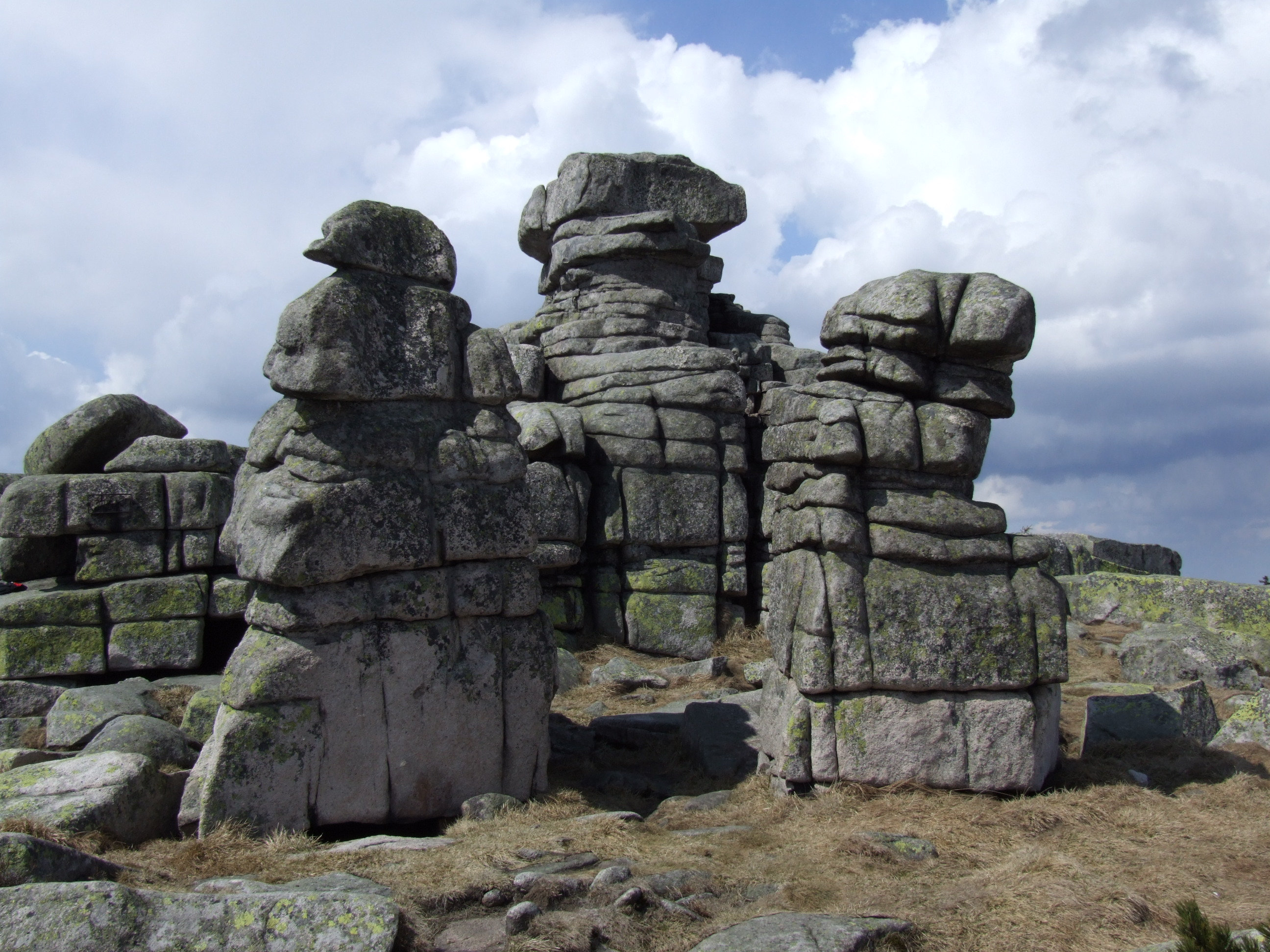
Granite outcrops at Silesian Stones Mountain in southwestern Poland

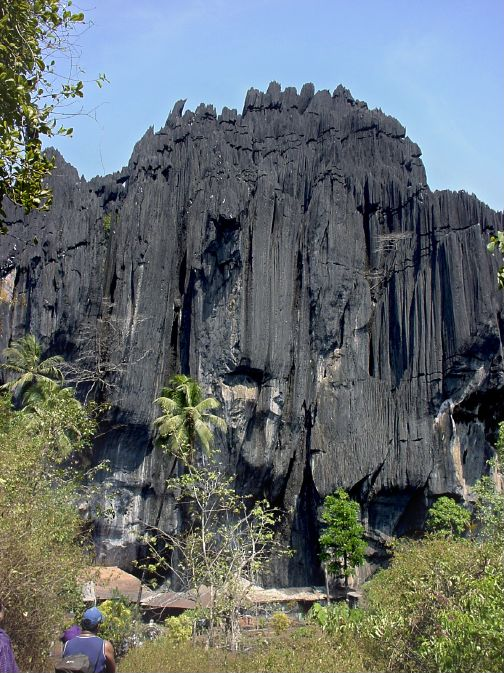
Outcrop near Yana, India

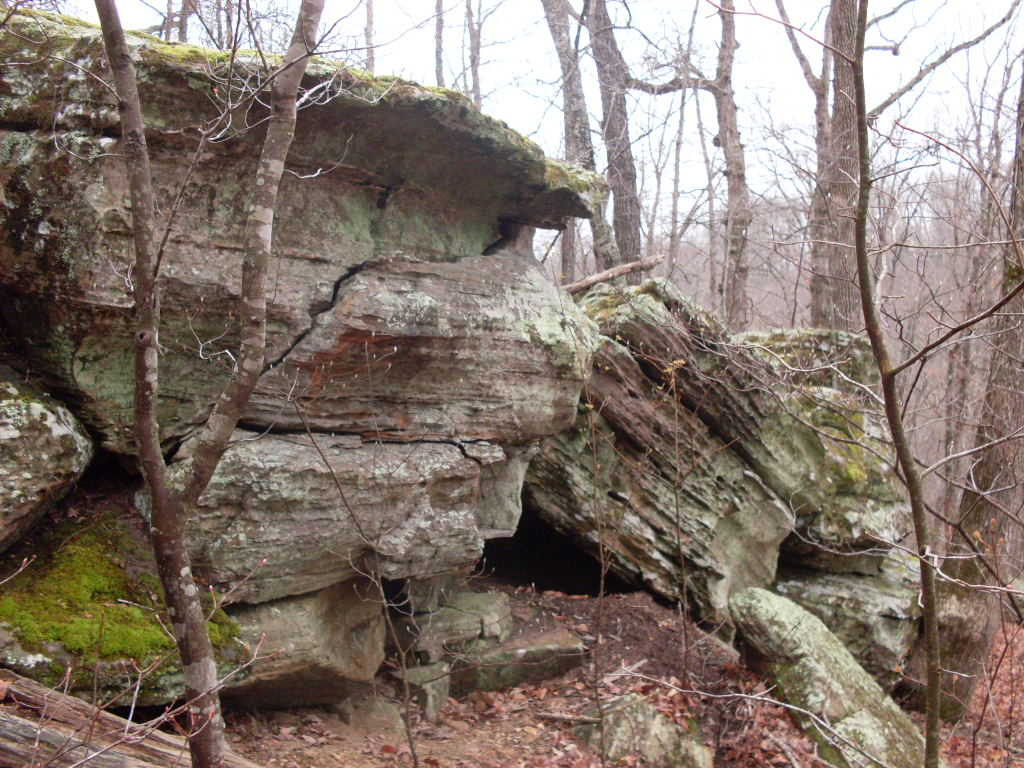
Outcrop of the Roubidoux Formation in the Ozarks of southern Missouri

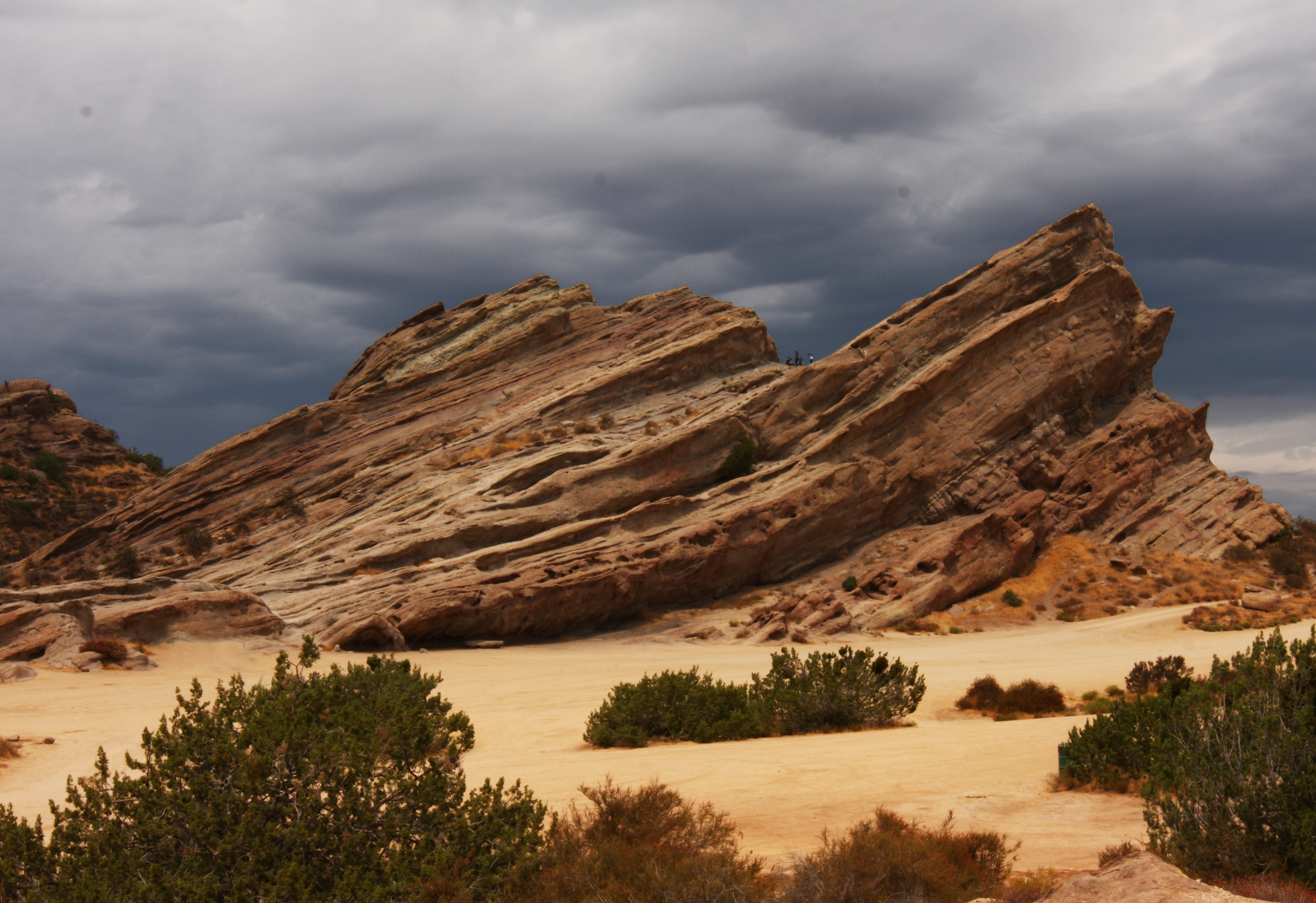
Outcrop in the Vasquez Rocks Natural Area Park of southern California

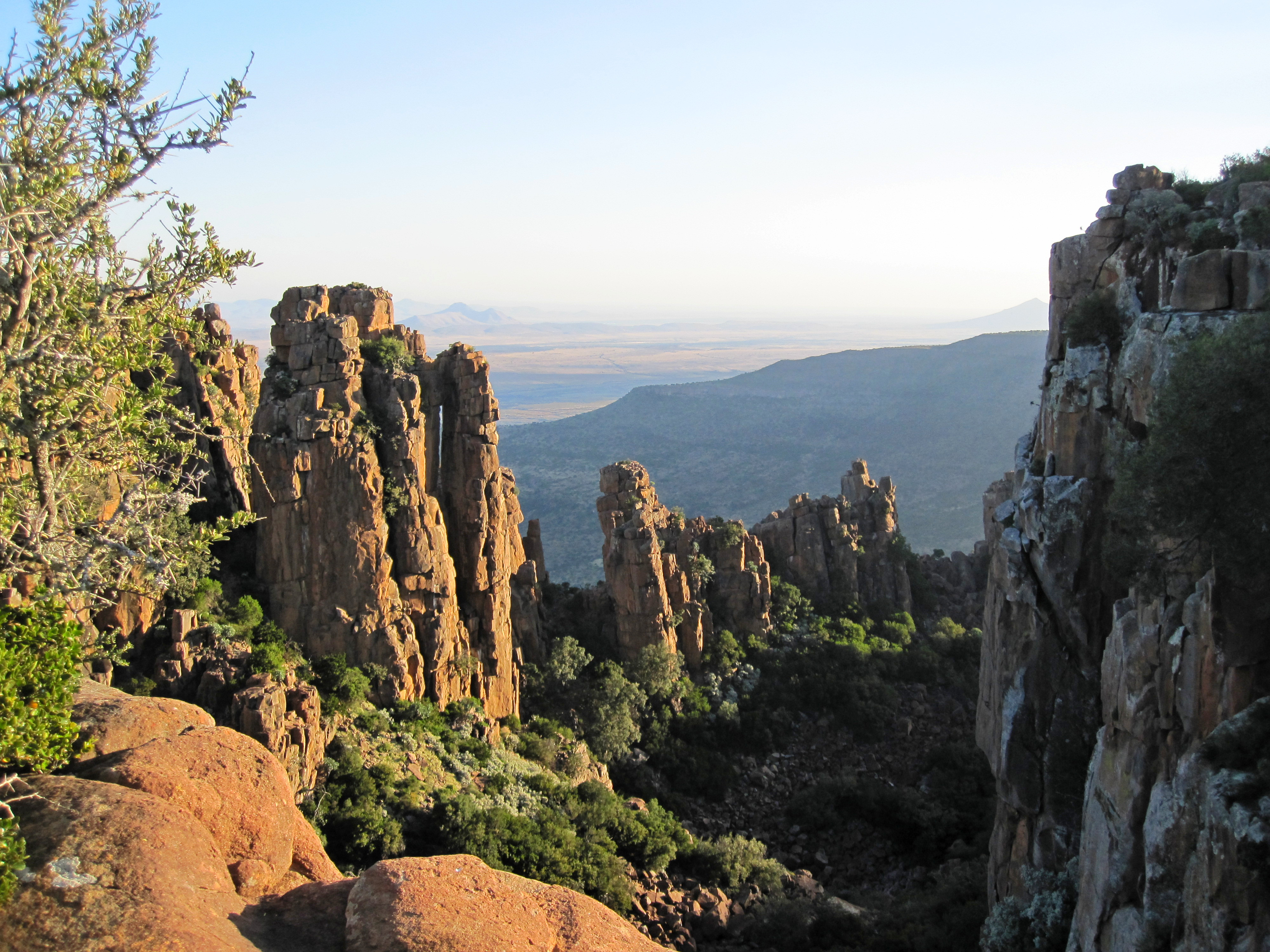
Valley of Desolation in the Camdeboo National Park

== See also ==
- Digital outcrop model – Digital 3D representation of the outcrop surface
- Geological formation – Fundamental unit of lithostratigraphy
- Geologic time scale – System that relates geologic strata to time
- List of rock formations
- Subcrop – Term in geology
- Floater (geology) – Rock fragments detached from original outcrop
